= Collins Park (Bayonne, New Jersey) =

Municipal park along the Kill van Kull

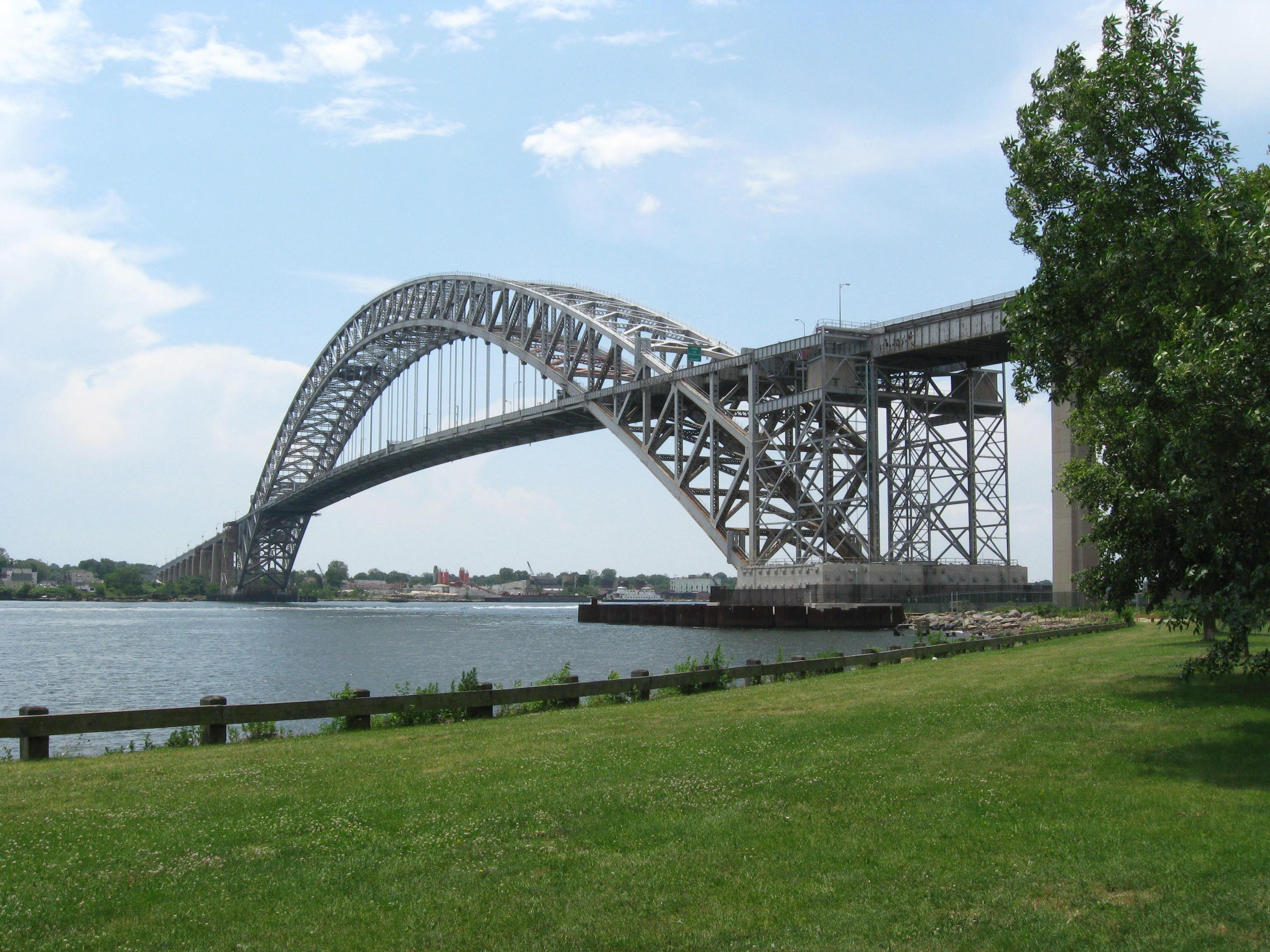
- Bayonne Bridge from Collins Park

- Location within Hudson County, New Jersey
- Location: Bayonne, New Jersey
- Coordinates: 40.64529°N 74.12536°W
- Area: 40 acres (16 ha)

Collins Park, or 1st Street Park, is the largest municipal park in Bayonne, New Jersey. It is located at the southern end of the city and runs for 0.75 miles (1.21 km) along the shore the Kill van Kull. Once known as Kill van Kull Park, it is named for Dennis P. Collins, who served at mayor of Bayonne from 1974 to 1990. The approach to the Bayonne Bridge crosses over the park at the west, under which will connect to the planned extension of Hackensack River Greenway at Bergen Point.

== History ==
The park comprises what were public and private parcels of land. Killeen Park, which had been upgraded in 1937 WPA project, was incorporated in Collins Park It was further built out in the 1950s. Portions were once property of Uncle Milty's Amusement Park or "Miltyville," which after its closure was purchased by the city in 1969. Brady's Dock, once a marina and ferry slip was incorporated the park in the 1980s, when it was rebuilt and the parkland expanded. Collins Park was substantially refurbished in two phases in the early 2020s.

== Memorials ==
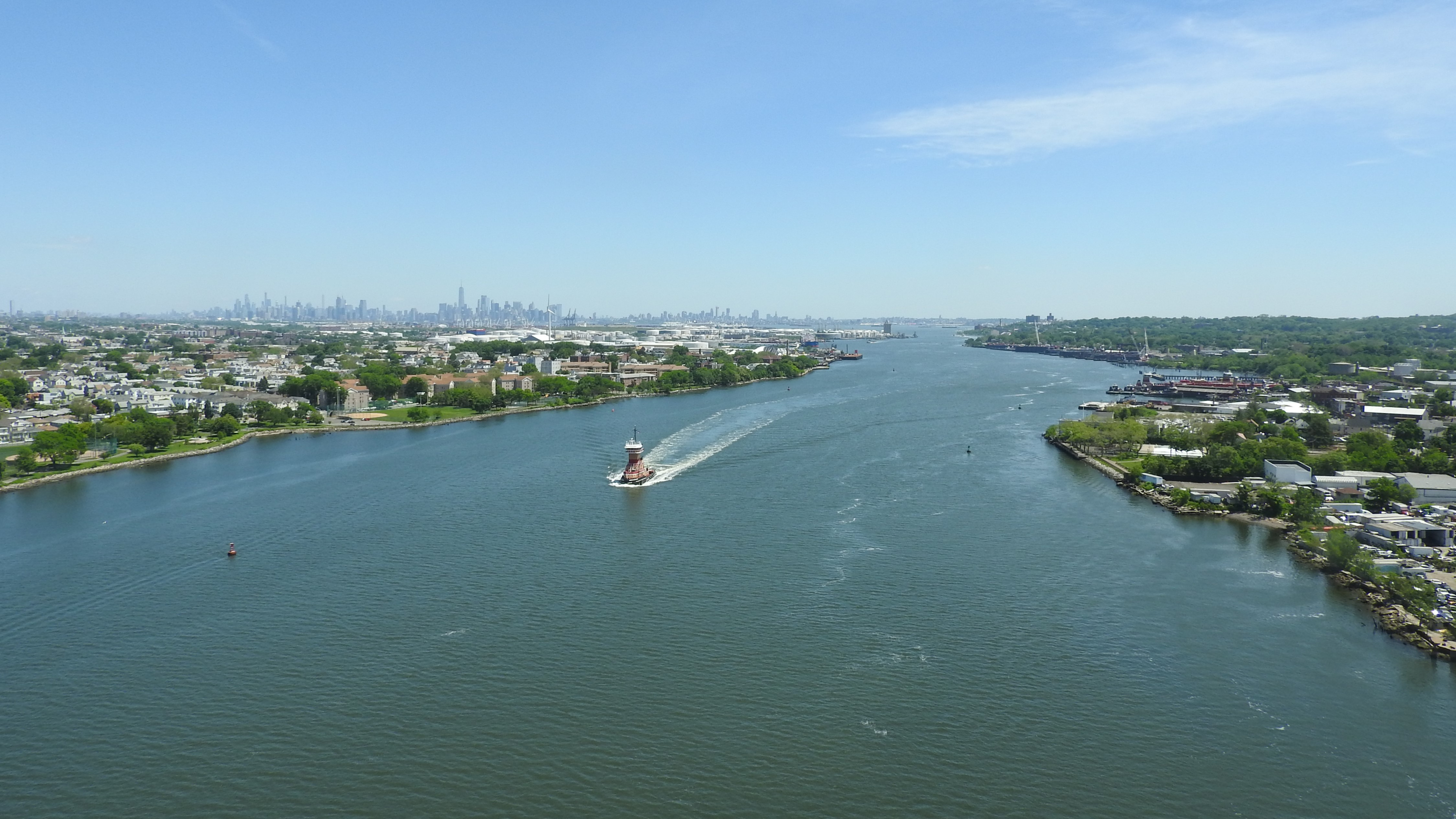
Collins Park (left) along Kill van Kull

Among the memorials in the park are those to veterans of World War II, the Vietnam War, the persons who built the Bayonne Bridge, and to victims of the September 11 attacks.

In 2022, a statue of Chuck Wepner, former professional boxer and local hero, was unveiled in the park.

== See also ==
- 16th Street Park
- Constable Hook
- Port Johnston Coal Docks
- Hudson River Waterfront Walkway
- Hudson County Park System
