= Stephen Lane =

Stephen Lane may refer to:

- Stephen K. Lane (1833–1896), mayor of Bayonne, New Jersey
- Stephen T. Lane, bishop of the Episcopal Diocese of Maine

== See also ==
- Arthur Stephen Lane (1910–1997), United States federal judge
- Steven Lane (born 1972), American racing driver
