= Pieter Van Buskirk =

American settler

Pieter Van Buskirk (c. January 1, 1655 – July 21, 1738), also spelled Boskerck, is considered the first settler in the Constable Hook area of Bayonne, New Jersey.

Van Buskirk was the son of Laurens Andriessen Van Buskirk and Jannetje Jans, settlers in New Netherland. Not long after their arrival at New Amsterdam they moved to Bergen, settling at Minkakwa.

Van Buskirk built a home and farm around the year 1700 on a bluff overlooking the shore of Upper New York Bay on what became known as Van Buskirk's Point at the confluence of the bay and Kill van Kull. Van Buskirk started a small family cemetery next to his house in 1736. His wife, Tryntje died on October 31 of that year and is buried in the cemetery. Pieter Van Buskirk died two years later and was also buried in the cemetery.

For over 200 years, Van Buskirk and his descendants lived in his farmhouse. Today, the farm and the cemetery are gone. Both were demolished in 1906 by the Standard Oil Company, which purchased the land to expand their refinery. A different cemetery that was opened by James Van Buskirk still exists today.

== See also ==
- Constable Hook Cemetery
