= James Donovan =

James Donovan may refer to:

- James Donovan (Boston politician) (1859–1929), Democratic politician from Boston
- James B. Donovan (1916–1970), lawyer and US Navy officer
- James G. Donovan (1898–1987), Democratic politician, New York state senator and US congressman
- James H. Donovan (1923–1990), Republican politician, New York state senator
- James J. Donovan (1890–1971), mayor of Bayonne, New Jersey 1939–1943
- James F. Donovan (1902–1979), American businessman and industrialist
- James Donovan (forensic scientist) (1944–2025), Irish forensic scientist

== See also ==
- Jim Donovan (disambiguation)
