= Matthew Cronin =

Matthew Cronin may refer to:

- Matt Cronin, a 21st-century baseball pitcher for the Washington Nationals
- Matthew T. Cronin, a 20th-century mayor of Bayonne, New Jersey
