= William Farr (disambiguation) =

William Farr was an epidemiologist and medical statistician.

William Farr is also the name of:

- William C. Farr (1844–1921), American politician from New Jersey
- William Farr School, Lincolnshire, England
