= Thomas Brady (mayor) =

7th mayor of Bayonne, New Jersey, from 1904 to 1906

7th Mayor of Bayonne
- In office 1904–1906
- Preceded by: Egbert Seymour
- Succeeded by: Pierre P. Garven

Personal details
- Born: September 1850 Ireland
- Died: March 13, 1928 (aged 77) Bayonne, New Jersey, U.S.
- Party: Democrat

Thomas Brady (September 1850 – March 13, 1928) was the 7th mayor of Bayonne, New Jersey, from 1904 to 1905. He was a founder of the Consumers' Coal and Ice Company, as well as the Bergen Point–Port Richmond Ferry.

== Biography ==
Born around 1850 in County Meath, Ireland, Brady emigrated to the United States at the age of ten and settled in Portland, Maine. At age 20, he moved to Bayonne, New Jersey.

He opened a grocery store and later, with his two of his brothers James and Terrence, started the Consumers' Coal and Ice Company in 1873. Brady helped establish a ferry from Bergen Point, at the southern tip of Bayonne, to Staten Island called the Bergen Point Port Richmond ferry. He then established a stage coach line from Greenville (modern day Jersey City) to the ferry at Bergen Point.

Brady, who was a Democrat, was appointed in 1885 by President Grover Cleveland to be the Postmaster of Bayonne. In 1903, Brady was elected mayor of Bayonne defeating Republican Pierre P. Garven and served for two years. In 1906, he returned to the company he helped found and worked there until his death at age 78.

== Death ==
After a two-year illness, Brady died on March 13, 1928, in his home. His funeral was at St. Andrew's R.C. Church in Bayonne. He is buried in Holy Name Cemetery in Jersey City. His wife Ellen had died two months earlier.

Preceded by Egbert Seymour	Mayors of Bayonne; 1904–1906	Succeeded by Pierre P. Garven
