= William Tapscott =

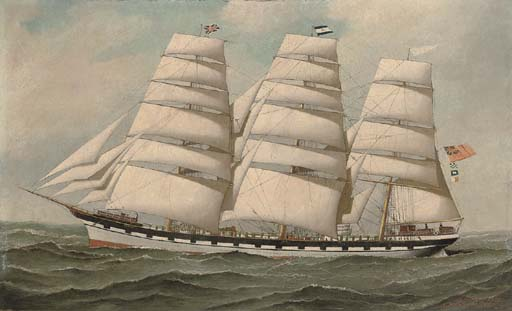
American Square Rigger Ship

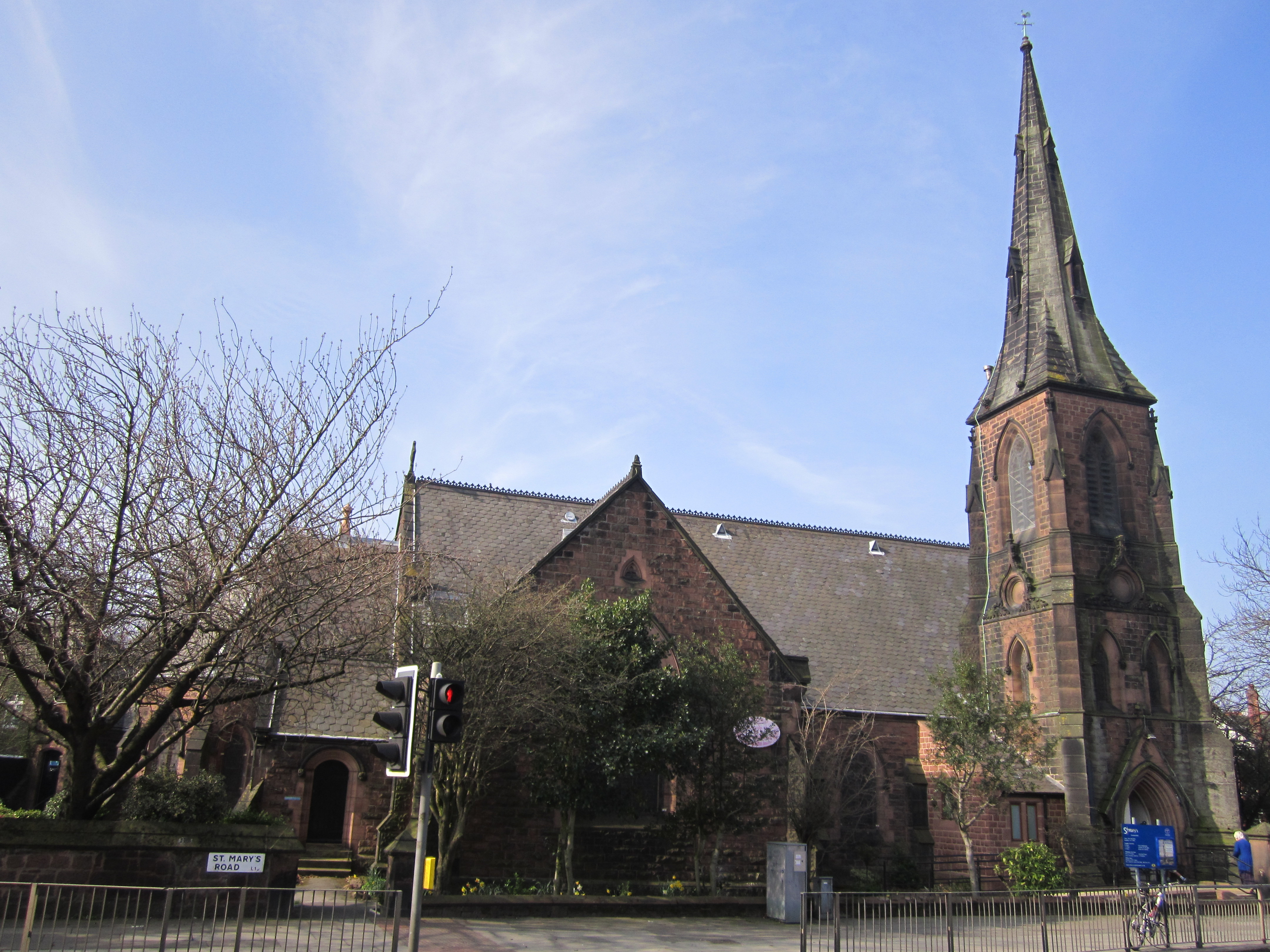
St. Mary's Church, located in a suburb of Liverpool, England.

The William Tapscott was an American square rigger ship, best known for transporting thousands of Mormon English immigrants from Liverpool, England to New York City, United States. The ship weighed 1,525 pounds, and its dimensions were 195' x 41' x 21', and the ship contained 3 decks and 3 masts. The William Tapscott was made out of White Oak Wood. It was built by Trufant and William Drummond at Drummond & Co. in Bathe, Maine. The ship launched on October 20, 1852.

From 1862 to 1878, the home port for the William Tapscott was in New York, USA. In 1888, the home port switched to Boston, Massachusetts, USA. During its time in operation, the William Tapscott traveled to and from New York, Boston, Honolulu, Liverpool, Ireland, Brazil, and New Zealand.

== Prominent Voyages During the Mormon Migration ==
Ports	Dates	Passenger Count	Accounts	Church Leader
Liverpool to New York	11 April 1859 – 13 May 1859	789	11	Robert F. Nelson
Liverpool to New York	11 May 1860 – 16 June 1860	772	13	Asa Calkin
Liverpool to New York	14 May 1862 – 25 June 1862	927	12	William Gibson

The Church of Jesus Christ of Latter-day Saints, informally known as "Mormons" prior to 2018, had a congregational mandate in the 1800s of gathering to Zion. This led to a mass migration of its followers from all over the world, particularly England. During the period of mass Mormon migration, over 85,000 people immigrated from Europe to settle with the Mormons in the West from the 1840s-1880's. The William Tapscott was one of many ships that helped with this migration. During this migration period it had three prominent voyages that occurred in the late springs of 1859, 1860 & 1862. Other notable ships that carried Mormon Migrants across the Atlantic include the: Humboldt, Franklin, Electric, Athena, John J. Boyd, Manchester, Windermere, Antarctic, B.S Kimball, Amazon, and Monarch of the Sea.

=== 1859 Voyage ===
The ship set sail from Liverpool on April 11, 1859 and arrived in New York, May 15, 1859. On board were Mormon migrants from England, Denmark, Scotland, Ireland, Sweden, and Norway. The Mormon Migrants were led by Robert Nelson with his counselors Henry Harris and George Rowley. The Mormon migrants were separated into two separate sections, one for those from Scandinavian countries and one for those who spoke English. Every morning, if the weather permitted the migrants would gather together to learn what their responsibilities of the day would be and offer a prayer. Of the notable events that took place on the ship there were 19 weddings, and 3 births. Also of note an elderly woman from Sweden was the only death that happened during the voyage.

=== 1860 Voyage ===
On May 11, 1860, the William Tapscott departed from a port in Liverpool, England. The ship was taking its second voyage with a large body of immigrating Mormon saints. Led by church leader Asa Calkin, 772 passengers boarded the ship and left on the month long journey across the Atlantic. 400 of the passengers onboard boarded with the intention to proceed to Utah Territory. The William Tapscott arrived in New York on June 16, 1860.

During the journey, many of the Saints contracted the disease smallpox, resulting in a delayed debarkation upon arrival in the New York harbor. A few days before the William Tapscott left Liverpool, about 300 of the passengers arrived in Grimbsy, England after getting seasick on their passage from Copenhagen, Denmark on board the ship Pauline.

=== 1862 Voyage ===
Under the Direction of Captain J. B. Bell the William Tapscott sailed from Liverpool on May 14, 1862, to New York arriving there June 25, 1862. The conditions of the ship was so terrible, that had the Captain been aware of them before sailing, he would have never gone on the voyage. By the second day, many people aboard the ship were seasick. Three weeks into the journey, a storm hit the William Tapscott and tore down many of the objects on board. The ship flooded, and the captain said it was the worst storm he had experienced on board in his 25 years of sailing. The crew had to continually pump water out of the boat until they landed in New York at the end of June. There were roughly 808 Mormon migrants abord the ship being led by William Gibson. The Mormon migrants were separated into 19 different wards. The captain made sure that the migrants were separated from other passengers, in an effort to make sure that there was no inappropriate or illegal behavior between the variety of groups that were sailing.

Throughout this specific voyage sea sickness was a major problem for the migrants. Three weeks into the voyage there was a storm that nearly capsized the ship. At points during the storm there was at least one foot of water on the first and second decks. The ship was in terrible condition, so much so that it started to leak, which had to be pumped out until it reached New York. At another point in the journey the waters were so still that it could not sail. This caused rationing of food for the Mormon migrants.

== 19th Century Mormon Migration Challenges ==
=== Civil War Immigration and Challenges ===
This Voyage distinguishes itself apart from the rest due to it taking place during the American Civil War. The number of immigrants wanting to go to Utah significantly increased between the 1861 to 1862. It is speculated that the increase was due to a Civil War prophecy by the founder of the Church of Jesus Christ of Latter-day Saints, Joseph Smith.

Other ships that Mormon immigrants traveled on in 1862 include the Humboldt, Franklin, Electric, Athea, John J. Boyd, Manchester, Windermere, and the Antarctic. Together the ships carried over 3,500 migrants intended to move to Utah. The ships left from Liverpool, England, Germany and France starting in early April and ending in the end of May. The migrants were recorded to have behaved well, leaving good impressions with those who they interacted with. Charles Dickens terme d the emigrants as "the pick and flower of England."

Once the migrants arrived in America many faced challenges. They would travel from New York to frontier by train. They dealt with rebel soldiers firing at the train in Missouri, and union soldiers trying to recruit them into service. Once the saints finally arrived at the frontier they would use down and back companies to get to Utah that had been supplied by the Church of Jesus Christ of Latter-day Saints.

=== Cholera Outbreaks ===
On top of these challenges, many immigrants, Mormon and not, suffered from cholera outbreaks during sea travel and afterwords. "It was a disease with which people were...familiar, yet it was little understood. It would strike suddenly, with no warning, often killing the victim within hours of the first symptoms. It was so uncontrollable that often entire families, even whole emigrating companies, would be wiped out." During the period of mass Mormon migration, cholera outbreaks were most prevalent along world trade routes, and immigrants passing through England ports were often affected.

== Life Aboard William Tapscott ==
In order to get as many Latter-day Saints as possible to Utah, the vessels that would take Mormon migrants were overcrowded. This created health problems when passengers would share the same toilet, and other personal hygiene areas. It also limited the amount of personal belongings that they were able to take with them on their journey.

Passengers that were on the William Tapscott did a variety of activities while they were crossing the Atlantic. Including celebrating many milestones and celebrations for all on the ship. During the 1859 voyage there were a total of 19 weddings. Including when Mormon migrant passenger Manager Mann married Lavina A. Smith. Additionally, 2 babies were born aboard ship during the passage, and 1 person passed away. Other celebrations on the same 1859 voyage included a birthday party for the ship's Captain, Captain Bell .

Sea Sickness was prevalent for many of the Mormon Migrants. Meaning that for some they stayed below decks for much of the journey. For those who were well enough, they would entertain themselves by dancing and singing. The Mormon Migrants would hold their regular meeting on their pilgrimage to Utah. Many of the migrants on board the ship would help with food preparation.

=== Religion aboard the William Tapscott ===
Religious practices were very common aboard the William Tapscott from 1859 to 1862. Once arriving on board, passengers were organized into different wards. Church leaders were assigned to manage the affairs of passengers planning to take the passage on the William Tapscott, as well as manage passengers on board. Many passengers recalled holding morning and evening prayer, along with recurring religious services. "Entertainment consisted of singing, instrumental music, games, and dancing."

== 1873 Legal Dispute ==
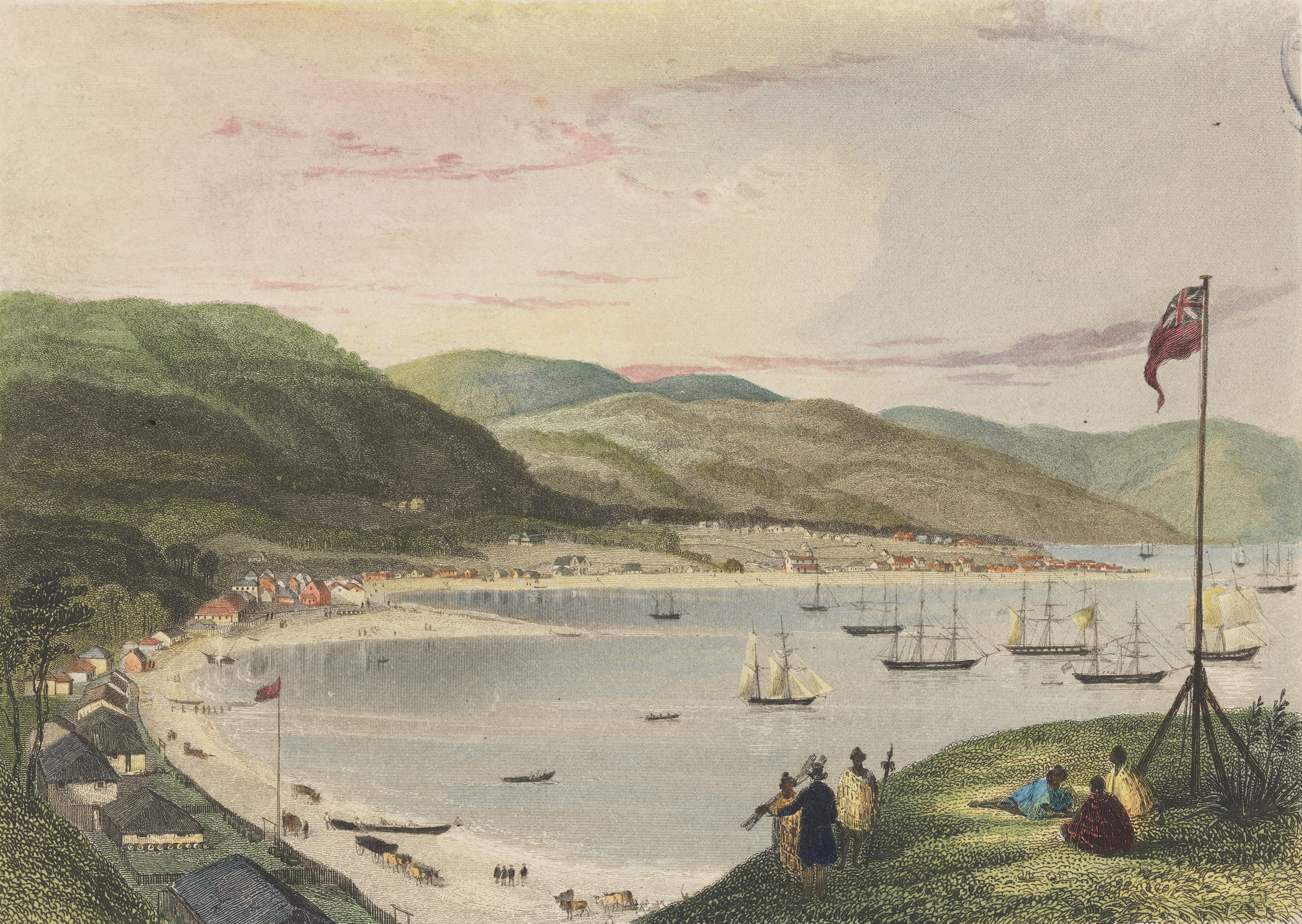
Lambton Harbour, Wellington, New Zealand ca 1840

After the William Tapscott's famous voyages around the turn of the 1850s, the ship continued to sail the ocean performing various duties. In July 1873, the William Tapscott was docked at a port in Wellington, New Zealand. Mutiny arose surrounding ideas of unfair treatment by the captain, James Cunningham Flynn, and concerns of the ships safety. The Chief Officer, Bernard King, shot a gun at Flynn in attempted murder and Flynn supposedly returned the shot by throwing an axe.

Simultaneously, two other members of the crew were also feuding, fueling the public controversy. Edmund Lewis, and George Fulton, both members of the crew, were both accused of revolt. They shared views that Flynn was abusive and the ship was unseaworthy. However, experts disagreed about the safeness of the ship. Some said it was safe to sail, other's said it was not. Lewis and Fulton both felt like a revolt was necessary because their unfair captain was forcing them to work on a dangerous ship. Soon after the ship docked in New Zealand, Lewis, George, and King were all jailed.

While court was being held, Flynn hired 22 new sailors. Less than two days after boarding, every new crew member refused to continue working for Flynn under the same complaint that the William Tapscott was unseaworthy. Eight men out of the crew of twenty two escaped on a small boat, and Flynn had them arrested, but they disappeared before their court hearing. The eight had reportedly continued reporting the unsafeness and unseaworthiness of the William Tapscott.

When police arrived on board the William Tapscott, they discovered 5 different men being detailed unlawfully. One claimed he was kidnapped from another ship and brought on board, and another claimed he never signed legal papers claiming his status as an official crew member. All 5 of the men also declared the ship was unseaworthy and unsafe.

Government agent, McIntyre, planned to secretly send Bernard King back to America on the ship. When the public found out about McIntyre's plan, there was an outcry and the news spread fast. People were not supportive of sending the attempted murder back on board with the person he tried to kill.

After four days of discussion, the Governor decided that he could not decide whether the ship was safe and decide the outcome of the extradition. Eventually, the William Tapscott was declared seaworthy. The courtroom was packed. Crew and the public responded by booing outside the courthouse.

== Shipwrecks ==
=== 1863 ===
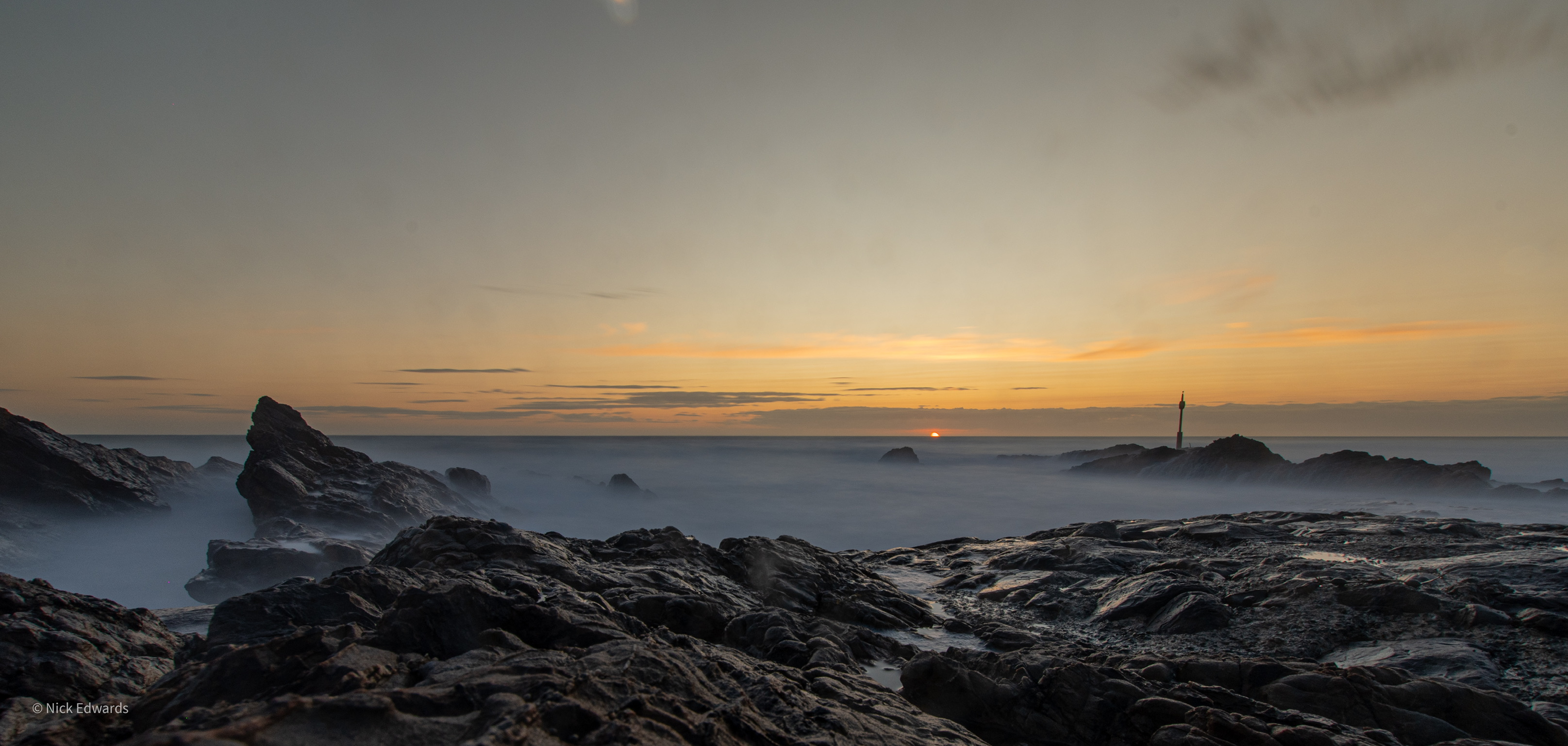
This is the Bude shore, near where the 1888 shipwreck happened.

On April 28, 1863, while traveling towards New York under the direction of Captain Bell the William Tapscott became stuck on the Pluckington Bank in Liverpool England. It was carrying roughly 800 German migrants In the days following the landing, many attempts were made to get the ship back into the water, but were not successful. At one point the ship began to take on water. Laborers then lightened the load and with the help of a steam pump the William Tapscott was freed from the shore on April 30, 1863.

=== 1888 ===
Shortly after midnight on March 30, 1888, the William Tapscott crashed on the Bude shore, located in the English Channel. It happened during a voyage from Rio de Janeiro, Brazil to England. The ship was carrying roughly 525 tons of Granite. The Standard, a paper for the London area, reported on March 31, 1888 "All went fairly well until reaching the Channel, when the weather thickened, and he was unable satisfactorily to make out his whereabouts. He attributes the Disaster to the thick hazy weather, the strong current along the shore, and the prevailing, north westerly wind." All 19 members of the crew made it safely to shore. The local St. Micheal's Church gave the crew all of the offerings it had received in two of the previous worship services. When leaving Bude Captain A. H. Fairburn gave his deepest thanks to the coastguard for ensuring that all the crew lived and were cared for. It was suggested at the time of his departure that the William Tapscott was in pieces never to be sailed again. In 1930, the granite the William Tapscott was carrying when it wrecked in 1888 was discovered and used as "a basis for footpath's in and around Bude."
