= Henry Meigs Jr. =

American politician (1809–1887)

1st Mayor of Bayonne
- In office 1869–1879
- Preceded by: none
- Succeeded by: Stephen K. Lane

President of the New York Stock Exchange
- In office 1877–1878
- Preceded by: Salem T. Russell
- Succeeded by: Brayton Ives

Personal details
- Born: May 7, 1809 New York, New York
- Died: June 7, 1887 (aged 78) Bayonne, New Jersey
- Party: Republican
- Spouse(s): Katherine T. Tyrrell, Mary Noel (Bleecker) McDonald
- Children: Katherine T., Henry III, Helen Noel

Henry Meigs Jr. (May 7, 1809 – June 7, 1887) was the Mayor of Bayonne, New Jersey, from 1869 to 1879. He was president of the New York Stock Exchange.

== Biography ==
Meigs was born May 7, 1809, in New York City, the son of Henry Meigs, U.S. Representative from New York. After the death of his first wife, Meigs married widow and poet Mary Noel (née Bleecker) McDonald on November 7, 1848. They moved to Bayonne in the 1860s and had a mansion built on Newark Bay.

On May 16, 1857, an act of the New Jersey Legislature was approved that called for commissioners to be appointed to lay out streets and avenues for the future city of Bayonne. Meigs was made one of the commissioners in 1868.

When Bayonne was incorporated as a city in 1869, Meigs, who was nominated by the citizens' ticket, was elected its first mayor to serve a two-year term on April 13 of that year. Meigs would be re-elected five consecutive times. In his later elections, he ran as a Republican. In his last election in 1877, Meigs defeated former councilman Jasper A. Cadmus. During his terms as mayor, the first schools were built, the first policemen were hired, the first fire company was organized, the first city hall was built and gas lights were installed on some streets. On June 1, 1877, Standard Oil Company opened its first refinery on Constable Hook.

During his last term in 1877, Meigs was elected president of the New York Stock Exchange in New York City for a one-year term. Meigs was succeeded by Stephen K. Lane.

Meigs died, at age 78, at home on June 7, 1887. His funeral was held in Trinity Episcopal Church in Bergen Point. He was buried in St. Peter's Episcopal churchyard in Perth Amboy, New Jersey.

Preceded by none	Mayors of Bayonne; 1869–1879	Succeeded by Stephen K. Lane
