= David W. Oliver =

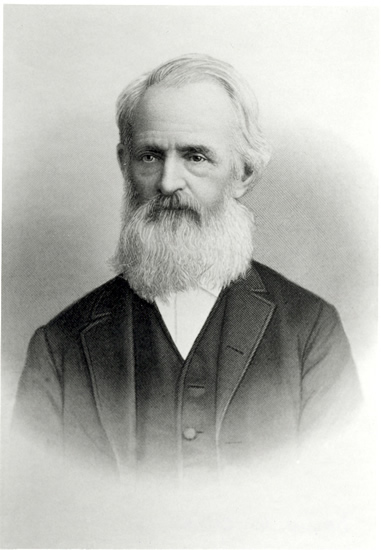

3rd Mayor of Bayonne
- In office 1883–1887
- Preceded by: Stephen K. Lane
- Succeeded by: John Newman

Personal details
- Born: December 19, 1819 Cincinnati, Ohio
- Died: February 12, 1905 (aged 85) Bayonne, New Jersey
- Party: Democrat
- Spouse: Mary Warner

David W. Oliver (December 19, 1819 – February 12, 1905) was the Mayor of Bayonne, New Jersey, from 1883 to 1887.

== Biography ==
Oliver was born in Cincinnati, Ohio, on December 19, 1819.

Oliver married Mary Warner of Vermont and became involved in real estate. A Democrat, Oliver ran for mayor of Bayonne in 1879 but lost to Republican Stephen K. Lane. Oliver ran successfully against Lane for mayor in 1883. He was re-elected in 1885. After leaving as mayor, Oliver became a member of the Bayonne Board of Adjustment.

He died on February 12, 1905, in Jersey City, New Jersey. He was buried in the family plot in Cincinnati, Ohio.

Preceded by Stephen K. Lane	Mayors of Bayonne; 1883–1887	Succeeded by John Newman
