= James A. Hamill =

American politician

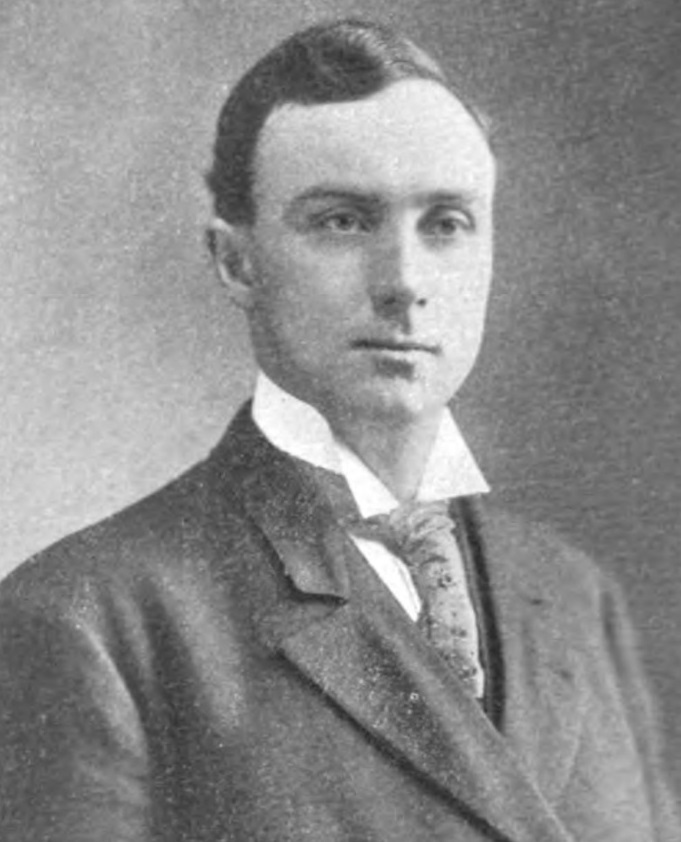
- From The Master, Mate and Pilot magazine, November 1908

Member of the U.S. House of Representatives from New Jersey
- In office March 4, 1907 – March 3, 1921
- Preceded by: Allan Langdon McDermott
- Succeeded by: Charles F. X. O'Brien
- Constituency: 10th district (1907–13); 12th district (1913–21)

Personal details
- Born: March 30, 1877 Jersey City, New Jersey
- Died: December 15, 1941 (aged 64) Jersey City, New Jersey
- Party: Democratic

James Alphonsus Hamill (March 30, 1877 – December 15, 1941) was an American attorney and Democratic Party politician. He served as the U.S. representative from New Jersey's 10th congressional district from 1907 to 1913 and 12th district from 1913 to 1921.

At the Paris Peace conference of 1919 he served as counsel to the unrecognized Ukrainian delegation.

== Early life and education ==
Hamill was born in Jersey City, New Jersey. He attended Saint Peter's College receiving his Bachelor's degree in 1897, and graduated from New York Law School in 1899; He was admitted to the bar of the State of New Jersey in 1900. Hamill served for four years in the New Jersey General Assembly (1902-1905), two of them as Minority Leader.

== Political career ==
At the Paris Peace Conference of 1919, Hamill served as counsel to the unrecognized Ukrainian Delegation. He was considered one of the best linguists in Congress, having at his command Greek, Latin, Russian, German and French and was decorated as a Chevalier of the French Legion of Honor for his work in French literature. During Eamon de Valera's visit to the United States in 1919, Hamill introduced a resolution in the House of Representatives calling on President Wilson to refuse to receive Auckland Geddes as Ambassador of both Britain and Ireland, but to receive Dr, Patrick McCartan, who had been sent by the Provisional government of Ireland as the Irish ambassador. Hamill represented Mayor Frank Hague in the free speech case which was instituted in July 1938 by the C.I.O. and the American Civil Liberties Union. He also led Jersey City's fight to recover $14,000,000 in taxes from the railroads. He was married to the former Mary Josephine Mylotte. They had six children.

== Death ==
Hamill died in 1941 and is interred in Holy Name Cemetery in Jersey City, New Jersey.

At the time of his death he had been Corporation Counsel of Jersey City for 14 years.

U.S. House of Representatives
Preceded by Allan L. McDermott	Member of the U.S. House of Representatives from New Jersey's 10th congressional district 1907 – 1913	Succeeded by Edward W. Townsend
Preceded by District created	Member of the U.S. House of Representatives from New Jersey's 12th congressional district 1913 – 1921	Succeeded by Charles F.X. O'Brien
