= List of shipwrecks in March 1888 =

The list of shipwrecks in March 1888 includes ships sunk, foundered, grounded, or otherwise lost during March 1888.

== 1 March ==
List of shipwrecks: 1 March 1888
Ship	State	Description
Keewadin	United Kingdom	The barque was abandoned in the Atlantic Ocean. Her crew were rescued by the steamship Dalesford (United Kingdom). Keewadin was on a voyage from Rosario, Argentina to Liverpool, Lancashire.

== 3 March ==
List of shipwrecks: 3 March 1888
Ship	State	Description
Guildford	United Kingdom	The steamship ran aground in the Suez Canal near El Kantara, Egypt. She was refloated on 5 March and resumed her voyage.
Isabella Stewart	United Kingdom	The ship ran aground in the River Thurso. She floated off and was driven ashore. She was on a voyage from Thurso, Caithness to Glasgow, Renfrewshire.
Pursuit	United Kingdom	The schooner was driven ashore at Littlestone-on-Sea, Kent. She was on a voyage from London to Whitehaven, Cumberland.
Pursuit	United Kingdom	The fishing boat ran aground and was wrecked at Dunbar, Lothian with the loss of two of her six crew.
Skjold	Norway	The brig sank in the North Sea. Her crew were rescued by the fishing smack Agnes and Louise (United Kingdom). Skjold was on a voyage from Methil, Fife, United Kingdom to Christiania.

== 5 March ==
List of shipwrecks: 5 March 1888
Ship	State	Description
Shamrock	United Kingdom	The steamship ran aground on the Craigmore Patch, off the coast of Stirlingshire. She was on a voyage from Grangemouth, Stirlingshire to Saint-Malo, Ille-et-Vilaine, France.

== 6 March ==
List of shipwrecks: 6 March 1888
Ship	State	Description
Sarah	United Kingdom	The barque was abandoned in the Atlantic Ocean. Her crew were rescued. She was on a voyage from Hull, Yorkshire to the Natal Colony.

== 7 March ==
List of shipwrecks: 7 March 1888
Ship	State	Description
Agra	United Kingdom	The barge was run into by the steamship Onward at Tower Bridge, London and sank.

== 8 March ==
List of shipwrecks: 8 March 1888
Ship	State	Description
Haabet	Norway	The schooner was run into by the steam trawler Talifoo (United Kingdom) and sank in the North Sea 120 nautical miles (220 km) off Spurn Head, Yorkshire, United Kingdom with the loss of two of her four crew. Survivors rescued by Talifoo.
Lanoma	United Kingdom	The barque was driven ashore and wrecked near Fleet, Dorset with the loss of twelve of her eighteen crew. She was on a voyage from Tasmania to London.

== 9 March ==
List of shipwrecks: 9 March 1888
Ship	State	Description
City of Corinth	United Kingdom	The full-rigged ship was run into by Tasmania (United Kingdom) and sank off Dungeness, Kent. Two of her 29 crew were rescued, the rest were reported missing, feared drowned. City of Corinth was on a voyage from Iquique, Chile to Hamburg, Germany.
Sirenia	United Kingdom	The full-rigged ship ran aground in thick fog on the Atherstone Ledge, off the Isle of Wight, on a voyage from San Francisco, California, United States to Dunkirk, Nord, France with bagged wheat, and became a wreck. The Brighstone (Brixton) lifeboat Worcester Cadet ( Royal National Lifeboat Institution), in three trips, rescued all 32 people on board, though two, along with the lifeboat's two coxswains, died after it briefly capsized on the second trip. The coxswain of the Brooke lifeboat was also drowned attempting a rescue. Some cargo was subsequently salvaged, and the wreck was sold "as lies" by auction in July 1888.

== 10 March ==
List of shipwrecks: 10 March 1888
Ship	State	Description
Brussels	Flag unknown	The ship was damaged by fire at San Francisco, California, United States.
Lady Dufferin	United Kingdom	The barque was driven ashore at Polpeor, Cornwall. Her seventeen crew were rescued by the Lizard Lifeboat. She was on a voyage from Newport, Monmouthshire to Montevideo, Uruguay.
Phil Sheridan	United States	The schooner was wrecked. Her crew were rescued by the steamship Peconic (United Kingdom).

== 11 March ==
List of shipwrecks: 11 March 1888
Ship	State	Description
Amalia	Norway	The ship was driven ashore and wrecked at Chanonry Point, Ross-shire, United Kingdom. She was on a voyage from Bo'ness, Lothian, United Kingdom to Christiania.
Bernardo	Italy	The barque was driven ashore and wrecked on Annet, Isles of Scilly, United Kingdom with the loss of all but her captain. She was on a voyage from Alicante, Spain to Cardiff, Glamorgan, United Kingdom.
Briminga	United Kingdom	Great Blizzard of 1888: The barque sank near Delaware Bay with the loss of all fourteen people on board.
Burns and Bessie	United Kingdom	The schooner was driven ashore at the Point of Ayre, Isle of Man. Her crew were rescued.
Ellen May	United Kingdom	A fish box full of fresh fish, with the mark DH 178, belonging to the Brixham, Devon fishing vessel was found and taken to St Ives, Cornwall. It is thought the vessel foundered during a storm.
Expert or Ellen May	United Kingdom	The Brixham cutter was engulfed by a large wave under Gurnard's Head, Cornwall and along with the crew of four not seen again.
Harvester	United Kingdom	Great Blizzard of 1888: The barque was driven ashore at Norfolk, Virginia, United States. Her crew survived. She was on a voyage from Londonderry to Baltimore, Maryland, United States.
Mary Sinclair	United Kingdom	The smack was driven ashore and wrecked at Rothesay, Isle of Bute. Her crew were rescued. She was on a voyage from Ardrishaig, Argyllshire to Glasgow, Renfrewshire.
Pamet	United States	The schooner sank at Salem, Massachusetts.
Perseverance	United Kingdom	The Mersey Flat sprang a leak and foundered. Her crew were rescued by Tolfaen (United Kingdom). Perseverance was on a voyage from Penmaen, Caernarfonshire to Widnes, Cheshire.
Persian	United Kingdom	The ship was driven onto the Velt Bank, off Falmouth, Cornwall.
Vivid	United Kingdom	The ketch was driven ashore at Scarborough, Yorkshire. Her crew were rescued by the Scarborough Lifeboat. Vivid was on a voyage from Hartlepool, County Durham to Woodbridge, Suffolk.
William Phillips	United Kingdom	The ship departed from Santos for Rio de Janeiro, Brazil and Cape Town, Cape Colony. No further trace, reported missing.
60 unnamed vessels	Flags unknown	Great Blizzard of 1888: Many tugs and other vessels were wrecked on the Delaware Breakwater with the loss of 20 to 25 lives.
200 unnamed vessels	Flags unknown	Great Blizzard of 1888: The ships, including 14 oyster schooners were driven ashore and wrecked in Chesapeake Bay with the loss of at least 40 lives.
28 unnamed vessels	Flags unknown	Great Blizzard of 1888: The ships were wrecked in Delaware Bay with the loss of 22 lives.
Five unnamed vessels	Flags unknown	Great Blizzard of 1888: The ships were wrecked at Norfolk, Virginia, Their crews survived.
Unnamed	United States	Great Blizzard of 1888: The ship was discovered off Crisfield, Maryland with all five crew frozen to death.
Five unnamed vessels	Flags unknown	Great Blizzard of 1888: Two steamships and three schooners were wrecked in Long Island Sound.

== 12 March ==
List of shipwrecks: 12 March 1888
Ship	State	Description
Charles W. White	United States	The barge, under tow by the steamship Gertrude (United States), sank in Huntington Bay on the north coast of Long Island, New York with the loss of a crew member.
Ellen and Sarah	United Kingdom	The crewless ketch was driven ashore in Bracklesham Bay.
Souvenir	Norway	The barque ran aground in Plymouth Sound. She was on a voyage from Buenos Aires, Argentina to Dunkirk, Nord, France. She was refloated with assistance from the tugs Belle and Raleigh (both United Kingdom) and taken in to Sutton Pool in a leaky condition.
William H. Starbuck	United States	The pilot boat sank after colliding with the steamship Japanese (United Kingdom) off Barnegat, New Jersey, with the loss of six of her crew.
Eleven unnamed vessels	United States	Great Blizzard of 1888: Nine pilot boats were driven ashore and two sank at New York. Their crews were rescued.

== 13 March ==
List of shipwrecks: 13 March 1888
Ship	State	Description
Enchantress	United States	Great Blizzard of 1888: The pilot boat Enchantress went down with all hands, at least ten lives.
W. L. White	United States	The schooner foundered at sea. Her crew took to a boat; they were rescued on 17 March by Record (United Kingdom). The derelict W. L. White was driven ashore on Heisker, Outer Hebrides, United Kingdom in January 1889.

== 14 March ==
List of shipwrecks: 14 March 1888
Ship	State	Description
Galgorm Castle	United Kingdom	The steamship was driven ashore and wrecked at Balgown Point, Wigtownshire with the loss of six of her eight crew. Survivors were rescued by rocket apparatus.

== 15 March ==
List of shipwrecks: 15 March 1888
Ship	State	Description
Premier	United Kingdom	The fishing smack was driven ashore and wrecked 3 nautical miles (5.6 km) north of Withernsea, Yorkshire. Her crew were rescued.

== 16 March ==
List of shipwrecks: 16 March 1888
Ship	State	Description
Kate and Jane	United Kingdom	The ketch foundered in the North Sea off the mouth of the Humber. All five people on board were rescued by the steamship Avochie (United Kingdom). Kate and Jane was on a voyage from Goole, Yorkshire to London.
Marne	United Kingdom	The steamship ran aground in The Wash.
Wanderer	United Kingdom	The ship was abandoned in the Atlantic Ocean. Her crew were rescued by the barque Rosalia (Italy). Wanderer was on a voyage from Laguna to Falmouth, Cornwall.

== 20 March ==
List of shipwrecks: 20 March 1888
Ship	State	Description
Grenada	United Kingdom	The steamship was wrecked at Le Conquet, Finistère, France. Her crew were rescued.

== 22 March ==
List of shipwrecks: 22 March 1888
Ship	State	Description
Bio Bio	United Kingdom	The ship departed from South Shields for Valparaíso, Chile. No further trace, reported missing.

== 23 March ==
List of shipwrecks: 23 March 1888
Ship	State	Description
Emla	Sweden	The brig ran aground off Sunderland, County Durham, United Kingdom and sprang a leak.

== 24 March ==
List of shipwrecks: 24 March 1888
Ship	State	Description
Christine	United Kingdom	The ship departed from Mauritius for Queenstown, County Cork. No further trace, reported overdue.
Levant	United Kingdom	The steamship departed from Penarth Glamorgan for Porto, Portugal. No further trace, presumed foundered with the loss of all fifteen crew. A Board of Trade report on her loss did not speculate on its cause, but she may have been overloaded.

== 26 March ==
List of shipwrecks: 26 March 1888
Ship	State	Description
John Bowes, and Orwell	United Kingdom	John Bowes and the steamship Orwell were run into by the steamship Upton (United Kingdom) at Deptford, Kent. Both vessels were severely damaged. Orwell ran aground.
Premier	United Kingdom	The brig was wrecked off Safi, Morocco.
Robinson	(United Kingdom of Great Britain and Ireland) Guernsey	The brig collided with the barque Pennine or the brigantine Rookwood (both United Kingdom) and sank off the North Foreland, Kent.
Sandvik	Sweden	The barque was wrecked at East London, Cape Colony. Her fourteen crew were rescued by rocket apparatus.
Valentine	France	The ship capsized 3 nautical miles (5.6 km) off Jersey, Channel Islands in a squall. She was on a voyage from Saint-Servan, Ille-et-Vilaine to Jersey.
Unnamed	Flag unknown	The brig collided with another vessel and sank 2 1/2 nautical miles (4.6 km) off Margate, Kent.
Two unnamed vessels	Germany	The ships were wrecked at or off Safi.

== 27 March ==
List of shipwrecks: 27 March 1888
Ship	State	Description
Caerau	United Kingdom	The steamship departed from Bilbao, Spain for Newport, Monmouthshire. Presumed subsequently foundered, possibly in the Bay of Biscay on 28 or 29 March.

== 28 March ==
List of shipwrecks: 28 March 1888
Ship	State	Description
Canonbury	United Kingdom	The steamship was wrecked on the Nantucket Shoals, off Nantucket, Massachusetts, United States with the loss of one of the 24 people on board. She was on a voyage from Matanzas, Cuba to Boston, Massachusetts, United States.
Saale	Germany	The ship ran aground in the Swash Channel. She was on a voyage from New York to Bremen.
Whitby Abbey	United Kingdom	The steamship ran aground on the Stag Bank, at the mouth of the River Tees. She was on a voyage from "Porman" to Middlesbrough, Yorkshire. She was refloated with the assistance of a tug and taken in to Middlesbrough for repairs.

== 29 March ==
List of shipwrecks: 29 March 1888
Ship	State	Description
Anna	Norway	The barque was destroyed by fire at Viana do Castelo, Portugal.
Canonbury	United Kingdom	The ship was driven ashore at Nantucket, Massachusetts, United States. Her crew were rescued. She was on a voyage from Matanzas, Cuba to Boston, Massachusetts.
Elizabeth Hendry	United Kingdom	The smack sank at Greenock, Renfrewshire. She was on a voyage from Oran, Algeria to Glasgow, Renfrewshire.
Emile, and Jacobine	France; Germany	The brig Emile and the barque Jacobine collided at Le Verdon-sur-Mer, Gironde. Both vessels were severely damaged.
Sikh	United Kingdom	The steamship ran aground and sank off Point de Galle, Ceylon. Her crew survived. She was on a voyage from London to a Chinese port.
William Tapscott	United Kingdom	The ship ran aground and was wrecked at Bude, Cornwall. Her nineteen crew were rescued. She was on a voyage from Rio de Janeiro, Brazil to Cardiff, Glamorgan.

== 30 March ==
List of shipwrecks: 30 March 1888
Ship	State	Description
Banrigh	United Kingdom	The steamship collided with the steamship Crescent (United Kingdom) in the River Thames at Millwall, Essex and was beached.

== 31 March ==
List of shipwrecks: 31 March 1888
Ship	State	Description
Trevelyan	United Kingdom	The ship was sighted in the Atlantic Ocean whilst on a voyage from Glasgow, Renfrewshire to Dunedin, New Zealand. Reported overdue; a lifebuoy from the ship washed up at Knysna, Cape Colony in early October. She may have been the vessel that foundered off Cape Agulhas, Cape Colony on the night of 3 June.

== Unknown date ==
List of shipwrecks: Unknown date in March 1888
Ship	State	Description
Albion	Norway	The barque was wrecked at Ross, Northumberland, United Kingdom with the loss of seven of her ten crew. She was on a voyage from Brevig to Hartlepool, County Durham, United Kingdom.
Ann	United Kingdom	The ship foundered off the coast of Northumberland on or before 18 March. The body of a crew member was landed at Amble, Northumberland by the keepers of the Coquet Lighthouse.
Anna	Norway	The ship was lost off the coast of Northumberland. Wreckage came ashore at Amble.
Antje	Germany	The schooner ran aground at Punta Nada, Spain.
Aristomene	Flag unknown	The ship caught fire at Newcastle, New South Wales. The fire was extinguished.
Azoff	Russia	The ship collided with Svict (Russia) at Galaţi, Romania and was severely damaged. She put in to Galaţi.
Benayo	Flag unknown	The steamship was driven ashore east of Tarifa, Spain and was abandoned by her crew.
Benlarig	United Kingdom	The steamship ran aground or was driven ashore in Japanese waters. She was refloated and taken in to Nagasaki in a severely damaged condition.
Bessie Morris	United Kingdom	The steamship was driven ashore east of Gibraltar on or before 2 March.
British Princess	United Kingdom	The barque was lost off Viana do Castelo, Portugal, on March, 29, with the loss of 22 of her 23 crew. She was on a voyage from Cardiff, Glamorgan to Rio de Janeiro, Brazil.
Canada	United Kingdom	The brig was driven ashore and wrecked at Figueira da Foz, Portugal.
Cortesia	Italy	The ship was abandoned at sea. She was on a voyage from Agrigento, Sicily to Philadelphia, Pennsylvania, United States.
Creole	United Kingdom	The steamship ran aground and sprang a leak at Livorno, Italy.
Dacapo	Norway	The brig was driven ashore at Egersund. She was on a voyage from Bo'ness, Lothian, United Kingdom to Stavanger. She was refloated and found to be leaky.
De Ruyter	United States	The ship ran aground at New York. She was on a voyage from Boston, Massachusetts, to New York.
Eagle	United Kingdom	The steamship ran aground at Sondre Rosse, Denmark.
Edith Godden	United Kingdom	The steamship was driven ashore at Saint Ann's Bay, Jamaica. She was refloated.
Elim	Norway	The schooner was driven ashore and wrecked 3 nautical miles (5.6 km) west of North Berwick, Lothian. Her crew were rescued.
Enrique	Germany	The brig was driven ashore and wrecked at Salamanca, Columbia.
Fie	Norway	The barque foundered in the North Sea with the loss of two of her crew. Two survivors were rescued by the smack Valentine (United Kingdom). Fie was on a voyage from Amsterdam, North Holland, Netherlands to Fredrikstadt.
Fleur de la Mer	France	The steamer sank off the Cayenne coast, French Guiana with the loss of sixty passengers.
Forward	United Kingdom	The brigantine was driven ashore at Saint Ann's Bay. She was refloated.
Gallilee	United Kingdom	The ship ran aground on the Scarweather Sands, in the Bristol Channel.
Guina	Netherlands	The barque was driven ashore at "Pitt", Sussex, United Kingdom. She was refloated with assistance from the tug India (United Kingdom), which towed her in to Newhaven, Sussex.
Hollandia	United Kingdom	The steamship was driven ashore at Almería, Spain. She was on a voyage from Cardiff to Genoa, Italy. Hollandia was refloated and taken in to Málaga, Spain in a leaky condition. She was placed under repair.
Jenny	Norway	The barque ran aground on the Caloot Bank, in the North Sea off the coast of Zeeland, Netherlands and sank. Her crew survived.
John Bamfield	United Kingdom	The barque ran aground on a sandbank 16 nautical miles (30 km) off Mazzarà Sant'Andrea, Sicily, Italy and broke in two. Her crew survived. She was on a voyage from the River Tyne to "Campanna".
John William	United Kingdom	The Humber Keel foundered in Stony Creek. Her crew were rescued.
Lionel George	United Kingdom	The steamship caught fire and was beached at Crosby, Lancashire. Her crew were rescued by the steamship Clyde (United Kingdom). Lionel George was a total loss.
Lorenzo Padre	Italy	The barque was destroyed by fire at sea. Her crew were rescued by the barque Fratelli Lozi (Italy).
Marshal	United Kingdom	The ship was wrecked off the Longstone Rock, Northumberland. Her crew took to the boats; they were rescued by the Boulmer Lifeboat. She was on a voyage from Thurso, Caithness to South Shields, County Durham.
Matheran	United Kingdom	The vessel foundered in the English Channel with the loss of all five hands. Last seen off the Isle of Wight on the 4th March.
Melchior Vidulich	Flag unknown	The ship was driven ashore and wrecked at Beaufort, South Carolina, United States. Her crew were rescued. She was on a voyage from Hull, Yorkshire, United Kingdom to Savannah, Georgia, United States.
Nicholas Smirk	United Kingdom	The lighter ran aground on the Plough Rock, off the coast of Northumberland. and was wrecked. She was being towed from Middlesbrough, Yorkshire to Aberdeen.
Norman	Germany	The steamship was driven ashore at Falkenberg, Sweden. She was on a voyage from Gothenburg to Stockholm, Sweden.
Olive Branch	United Kingdom	The ship ran aground at Maassluis, South Holland, Netherlands. She was on a voyage from Odesa, Russia to Rotterdam, South Holland.
Osiris	United Kingdom	The steamship was driven ashore at New Brighton, Cheshire. She was later refloated.
Pleione	United Kingdom	The ship was driven ashore at Waikanach, New Zealand. She was on a voyage from London to Wellington, New Zealand. She was refloated in July.
Plutarch	Norway	The barque was holed by ice and sank in the Elbe. She was on a voyage from Jamaica to Hamburg, Germany.
President Sverdrup	Germany	The ship was wrecked at Cape San Antonio, Cuba. Her crew survived.
Railway	United Kingdom	The ketch was driven ashore at Barry Island, Glamorgan. Her crew were rescued by rocket apparatus.
Resolven	United Kingdom	The steamship was driven ashore. She was later refloated and put in to Odesa.
Rolf	Denmark	The barque was driven ashore at the mouth of the Uggerby Å. She was on a voyage from Havre de Grâce, Seine-Inférieure, France to Aarhus.
Rubena	United Kingdom	The steamship ran aground at Palmas, Brazil. She was on a voyage from Zárate, Argentina to Liverpool, Lancashire.
Ruth	Norway	The brig was abandoned in the North Sea. She was on a voyage from Christiania to London. She came ashore at Middelkerke, West Flanders, Belgium.
Scotia Queen	United Kingdom	The barque was driven ashore at Cape St. Antonio, Cuba. She was on a voyage from Saint Lucia to Goole. She was refloated and taken in to Havana, Cuba in a leaky condition.
Shark	United Kingdom	The steamship ran aground on the Gunnaway Rock, off the coast of County Down.
Sikh	United Kingdom	The ship struck a rock at "Gindareh", Ceylon and foundered. Her crew were rescued. She was on a voyage from the Clyde to Yokohama, Japan.
St. Bede	United Kingdom	The brig was driven ashore and wrecked at Pakefield, Suffolk. Her crew were rescued. She was on a voyage from Dordrecht, South Holland to Newcastle upon Tyne, Northumberland.
Sunrise	United Kingdom	The schooner struck the Navestone Rock. She was beached at North Sunderland, Northumberland.
Times	(United Kingdom of Great Britain and Ireland) Guernsey	The schooner was driven ashore at Mundesley, Norfolk. Her crew were rescued by rocket apparatus. She was on a voyage from the River Tyne to Weymouth, Dorset.
Vega	Norway	The steamship was driven ashore at "Easter", Zeeland. All on board were rescued. She was on a voyage from Bergen to Antwerp, Belgium. She was a total loss.
Wilkesbarre	United States	The ship was driven ashore near Newhaven, Connecticut. She was on a voyage from Boston, Massachusetts to Port Johnston, New Jersey. She was refloated and towed in to New York in a severely leaky condition,.
Willing	(United Kingdom of Great Britain and Ireland) Jersey	The brigantine ran aground on the South Rock, off the coast of County Down. She was on a voyage from Gallipoli, Ottoman Empire to Glasgow, Renfrewshire. She was refloated and taken in to Donaghadee, County Down in a waterlogged condition.
Zephyr	Flag unknown	Great Blizzard of 1888: The ship was driven ashore and wrecked at the Delaware Breakwater. She was on a voyage from Maceió, Brazil to New York. She was later refloated with the assistance of a steamship.
Unnamed	Flag unknown	The ship was lost off the north coast of Spain on or before 10 March. Wreckage came ashore at Cobos, near Ferrol.
Unnamed	United Kingdom	The barque was driven ashore and wrecked at Caminha, Portugal with some loss of life.
