= John Newman (mayor) =

American politician

4th Mayor of Bayonne
- In office 1887–1891
- Preceded by: David W. Oliver
- Succeeded by: William C. Farr

Personal details
- Born: c. 1829 England
- Died: October 29, 1901 Bayonne, New Jersey
- Party: Republican

John Newman was the Mayor of Bayonne, New Jersey from 1887 to 1891.

== Biography ==
Newman was born in England around 1829 and immigrated here with his family to New York City when he was a baby. As a boy, he worked in a dry goods store. He spent ten years working in the New York harbor transportation business. He joined the Produce Exchange when it began and later served as its president. He became a junior partner in the insurance firm of Brown & Newman. Newman moved across the river to Bayonne around 1860.

A Republican, Newman was elected as a councilman in 1873. He was elected president of the Bayonne City Council in 1881. He would serve ten years on the council. He won election to mayor of Bayonne in 1887. He won re-election in 1889. During his time in office, he instituted street paving for Bayonne. He lost a chance for a third term when he was defeated by Republican Councilman William C. Farr, who also was endorsed by the Democrats and the Independent Parties in a highly contested election. A year after the election, Newman switched to the Democratic Party.

Newman, a banker, was president of the Mechanics Trust Fund and the Bayonne Mutual Building and Loan Association.

Newman died from Bright's Disease in his home on October 29, 1901.

Preceded by David W. Oliver	Mayors of Bayonne; 1887–1891	Succeeded by William C. Farr
