= Pierre Prosper Garven =

American politician from New Jersey (1872-1938)

8th and 12th Mayor of Bayonne, New Jersey
- In office 1906–1910
- Preceded by: Thomas Brady
- Succeeded by: John J. Cain
- In office 1915–1919
- Preceded by: Bert Daly
- Succeeded by: W. Homer Axford

Personal details
- Born: June 9, 1872 Bayonne, New Jersey
- Died: October 19, 1938 (aged 66) Jersey City, New Jersey
- Party: Republican
- Spouse: Mary McNaughton

Pierre Prosper Garven was the Mayor of Bayonne, New Jersey. He was an alternate delegate to 1916 Republican National Convention for New Jersey. He was the Hudson County Prosecutor of the Pleas in 1919.

== Biography ==
He was born on June 9, 1872, in Bayonne, New Jersey.

He worked as a clerk for the Central Railroad of New Jersey while going to law school. He graduated and became an attorney for the railroad. Garven was very active playing tennis and baseball. In 1899, he married Mary McNaughton. Garven entered politics as a Republican and while the Democratic Party was split, he managed to get elected mayor in 1906. At age 34, he was, at the time, the youngest mayor ever elected and would serve two terms. His bid for a third term was stopped temporarily when he was defeated by Democrat John J. Cain in 1910.

In 1915, after Mayor Bert Daly stepped down, there was a special election which Garven won for the third time. In July 1915, Garven's involvement in the Bayonne refinery strikes of 1915–1916 was somewhat compromised by his simultaneous employment as counsel for Standard Oil of New Jersey.

He served four more years as mayor until 1919. In 1916, Garven was an alternate delegate to Republican National Convention. He was the leader of the Republican Party of Bayonne from 1906 to 1923. In 1919, Garven became the Hudson County Prosecutor of Pleas. In 1934, he became the Assistant State Attorney General for New Jersey.

Garven suffered a stroke while visiting his daughters and died on October 19, 1938, in the Jersey City Medical Center. He is buried in Bayview – New York Bay Cemetery in Jersey City, New Jersey.

== Legacy ==
Garven's son Pierre P. Garven was Chief Justice of the New Jersey Supreme Court for seven weeks in 1973, from when he took office as Chief Justice on September 1, 1973, to when he died of a stroke on October 19, 1973.

Preceded by Thomas Brady	Mayors of Bayonne; 1906–1910	Succeeded by John J. Cain
Preceded by Bert Daly	Mayors of Bayonne; 1915–1919	Succeeded by W. Homer Axford
