= Charles F. X. O'Brien =

American politician

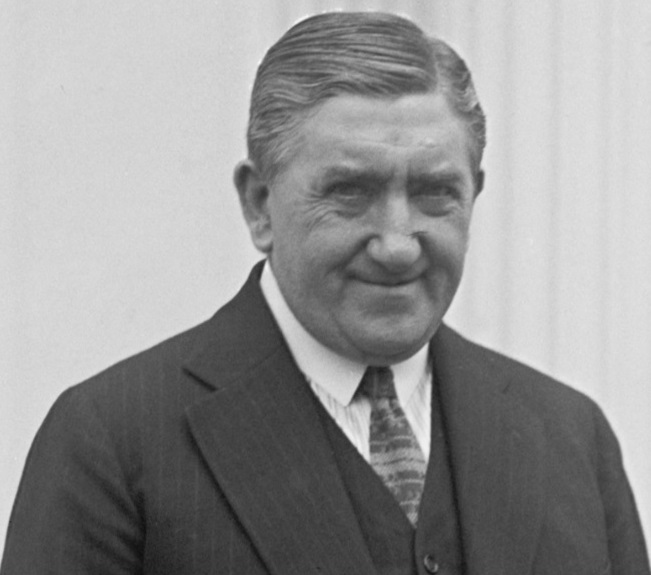

Member of the U.S. House of Representatives from New Jersey's 12th district
- In office March 4, 1921 – March 3, 1925
- Preceded by: James A. Hamill
- Succeeded by: Mary Teresa Norton

Personal details
- Born: March 7, 1879 Jersey City, New Jersey, US
- Died: November 14, 1940 (aged 61) Jersey City, New Jersey, US
- Party: Democratic

Charles Francis Xavier O'Brien (March 7, 1879 – November 14, 1940) was an American Democratic Party politician. He served as U.S. Representative from New Jersey's 12th Congressional District from 1921 to 1925.

== Biography ==
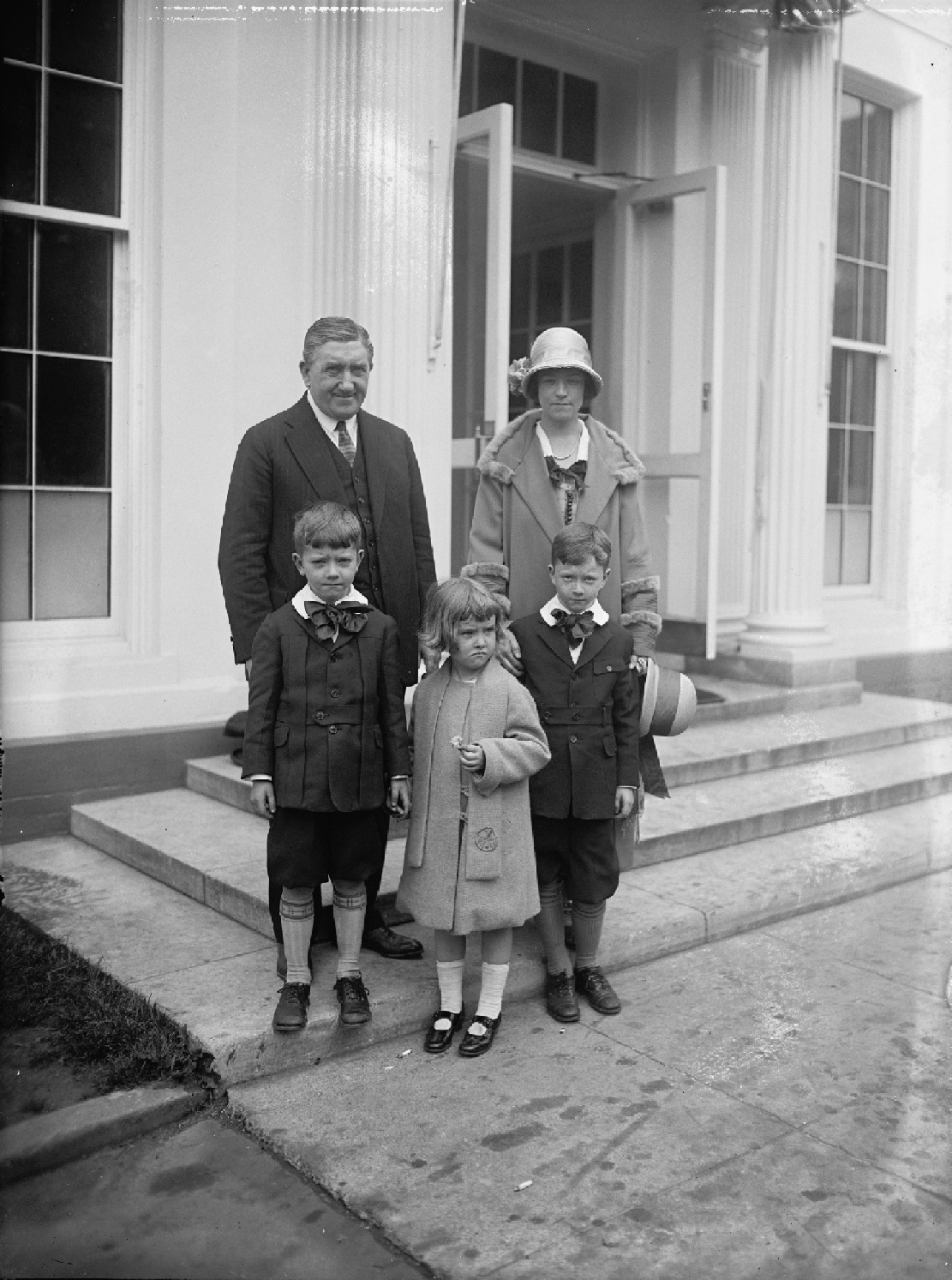
Rep. F.X. O'Brien & family, June 10, 1924. National Photo Company Collection, Library of Congress.

O'Brien was born in Jersey City, New Jersey, on March 7, 1879. He attended the Jersey City Public Schools, Academy of St. Aloysius Grammar School and Saint Peter's College. He graduated from Fordham University. He studied law at the New York Law School, was admitted to the bar and commenced practice in Jersey City. He was a judge of the second criminal court, and was director of public safety of Jersey City from 1917 to 1921. He was a delegate to the 1920 Democratic National Convention.

O'Brien was elected as a Democrat to the Sixty-seventh and Sixty-eighth Congresses, serving in office from March 4, 1921 to March 3, 1925. He voluntarily retired to accept the position of registrar of records of Hudson County, New Jersey, serving from 1926 to 1936. He was serving in the city law department at the time of his death in Jersey City on November 14, 1940, and was interred in Holy Name Cemetery.

U.S. House of Representatives
Preceded by James A. Hamill	Member of the U.S. House of Representatives from New Jersey's 12th congressional district March 4, 1921 – March 3, 1925	Succeeded by Mary Teresa Norton
