= Mayors of Bayonne, New Jersey =

Mayor in Bayonne, New Jersey

Bayonne, New Jersey was incorporated on April 1, 1861 as a township. It was reincorporated on March 10, 1869 as a city. It is currently governed within the Faulkner Act, formally known as the Optional Municipal Charter Law, under the Mayor-Council system of municipal government (Plan C), implemented based on the recommendations of a Charter Study Commission as of July 1, 1962, before which it was governed by a Board of Commissioners under the Walsh Act. The governing body consists of a mayor and a five-member city council, of which two of the seats are elected at-large, and three from wards. This is a list of the mayors of the city of Bayonne, New Jersey.

== Mayors ==
| Term | Mayor | Notes |
|---|---|---|
| 1869–1879 | Henry Meigs, Jr. | Henry Meigs, Jr. was the first mayor of Bayonne, New Jersey. He took office on March 10, 1869. |
| 1879–1883 | Stephen Knowlton Lane | |
| 1883–1887 | David W. Oliver | |
| 1887–1891 | John Newman | |
| 1891–1895 | William C. Farr | |
| 1895–1904 | Egbert Seymour | |
| 1904–1906 | Thomas Brady | |
| 1906–1910 | Pierre Prosper Garven | This was his first term. |
| 1910–1912 | John J. Cain | Cain (July 5, 1861 – January 17, 1937) was the 9th mayor. Born in Jersey City, New Jersey, Cain started work as a mechanic and worked for the Babcock & Wilcox Boiler Company in Bayonne. He married Katherine Drudy. Cain became involved in politicsin the early 1900s. In 1910, Cain, a Democrat, defeated the incumbent Pierre P. Garven. Cain was very independent and was many times at odds with the city's Democratic party. The following year, when he ran for re-election, he lost in the Democratic primary to Bayonne's Democratic leader Matthew T. Cronin. Cain lost again in 1914, ending his political career. He died at home after a lengthy illness at age 75. His funeral was at St. Henry's Church in Bayonne. He is buried in Holy Name Cemetery in Jersey City. |
| 1912–1914 | Matthew T. Cronin | |
| 1914–1915 | Bert J. Daly | This is his first term. Dr. Bert J. Daly served three non-consecutive terms from 1914–1915, 1927–1931 and 1943–1947. |
| 1915–1919 | Pierre Prosper Garven | This was his second term. |
| 1919–1923 | W. Homer Axford | He was the director of public affairs on the Bayonne, New Jersey City Commission in 1930. He was head of the X-ray department of the Jersey City Hospital in 1930. |
| 1923–1927 | Robert J. Talbot | |
| 1927–1931 | Bert J. Daly | This is his second term. |
| 1931–1939 | Lucius F. Donohue | |
| 1939–1943 | James J. Donovan | |
| 1943–1947 | Bert J. Daly | This is his third term. |
| 1947–1951 | Charles A. Heiser | |
| 1951–1955 | Edward F. Clark | |
| 1955–1959 | G. Thomas DiDomenico | Dominico - 16th Street Park is named in his honor. |
| 1959–1962 | Alfred V. Brady | |
| 1962–1974 | Francis G. Fitzpatrick | Fitzpatrick Park is named in his honor. |
| 1974–1990 | Dennis P. Collins | Dennis P. Collins is the longest-serving mayor of Bayonne, New Jersey, serving from 1974 to 1990. He served for 16 years. Collins Park is named for him. |
| 1990–1994 | Richard A. Rutkowski | Rutowski Park named in his honor. |
| 1994–1998 | Leonard P. Kiczek | |
| 1998–2007 | Joseph Doria | |
| 2007–2008 | Terrance Malloy | |
| 2008–2014 | Mark Smith | |
| 2014-2026 | James Davis | |
| 2026 | Robert Kubert | Appointed interim mayor when Davis resigned to become Hudson County Sheriff at the start of 2026. |
| 2026- | Sharon Ashe Nadrowski | Won election to full four-year mayoral team to replace interim mayor Kubert in mid-May 2026, effective July 1, 2026. |
