= Jim Donovan =

Jim Donovan may refer to:

- Jim Donovan (musician) (born 1968), member of the band Rusted Root
- Jim Donovan (sportscaster) (1956–2024), former NBC television sportscaster and sports director at WKYC-TV in Cleveland, Ohio
- Jim Donovan (director) (born 1964), Canadian television and film director
- Jim Donovan (banker) (21st century), American banker

== See also ==
- James Donovan (disambiguation)
