= Dennis P. Collins =

American politician

24th Mayor of Bayonne, New Jersey
- In office 1974–1990
- Preceded by: Francis G. Fitzpatrick
- Succeeded by: Richard A. Rutkowski

Personal details
- Born: June 12, 1924 Bayonne, New Jersey, US
- Died: December 6, 2009 (aged 85) Bayonne, New Jersey
- Party: Democratic
- Spouse: Mary

Dennis P. Collins (June 12, 1924 – December 6, 2009) was an American Democratic party politician who served as the 24th mayor of Bayonne, New Jersey from 1974 until his retirement in 1990.

== Biography ==
Born and raised in Bayonne, Collins attended St. Vincent De Paul grammar school and Holy Family Academy. He served in the United States Army for three years during World War II. Collins was elected to the Bayonne City Council in 1962, and served 12 years until being elected as mayor. His four terms in office make him the longest-serving mayor in Bayonne city history. Collins served as a Democratic elector from New Jersey in the 2000 Presidential election.

== Legacy ==
Collins Park, the largest municipal park in Bayonne, is named in his honor. In 2007 the United States Congress named the city's Main Post Office in his honor.
