= Constable Hook Cemetery =

Cemetery in Bayonne, New Jersey, US

Bayonne Constable Hook Cemetery
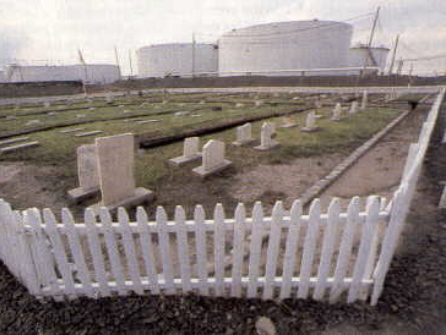
- Interactive map of Bayonne Constable Hook Cemetery

Details
- Established: 1849
- Location: East 22nd Street, Bayonne, New Jersey
- Country: United States
- Coordinates: 40.65762°N 74.10687°W
- Type: Private
- Size: 2 acres (0.81 ha)
- Find a Grave: Bayonne Constable Hook Cemetery

Constable Hook Cemetery is the name used to refer to two cemeteries on Constable Hook in Bayonne, New Jersey, the extant Bayonne Constable Hook Cemetery and the no longer existing Van Buskerck Family Burial Ground. Both were founded by members of the van Buskirk family, descendants of the cape's first settler, Pieter Van Buskirk. In 1906 the Standard Oil Company purchased the family land to expand their refinery, already the largest in the world at the time. Myths and historical inaccuracies have led to confusion about the two burial grounds.

== Bayonne Constable Hook Cemetery ==
James J. Van Buskirk (1791–1856), of the sixth generation of early Dutch settlers in Bayonne, laid out a cemetery in 1849 during a cholera epidemic which had struck the area. In 1854 Van Buskirk wrote a will and mentioned 2 acres (8,100 m^{2}) of his land situated at Constable Hook off East 22 Street was to be reserved for the cemetery. Many prominent Bayonne residents were buried there. It was later enclosed by oils tanks of Tide Water Oil Company.

The official name of the cemetery is not known, but it was often referred to in documents as "Hook Cemetery", "Bayonne Cemetery", "Constable Hook" et al. It is currently called "The Bayonne Constable Hook Cemetery".

Today part of the cemetery still exists due to a restoration project of the 1980s. The cemetery is surrounded by property owned by International Matex Tank Terminal, which owns about 600 acres on the hook. Some remains were relocated to the Moravian Cemetery on Staten Island. There are approximately 140 headstones. Information about the graves prior to the 1880s is incomplete.

== Van Buskirk Family Burial Ground ==
The Van Buskirk Family Burial Ground which has also been known as Constable Hook Cemetery, the old Van Buskirk's Cemetery and the Constable Hook Graveyard was founded by Pieter Van Buskirk in about 1736. The cemetery was located on a bluff on the north side of the cape near the homestead and held the remains of early settlers to the region, most of which were disinterred and transferred to other cemeteries. A survey taken in 1903, two or three years before it the cemetery was obliterated, counted 104 headstones. The burial ground became the subject of a court case between Standard Oil and members of the Van Buskirk family, who contended the sale to the oil company by one family member in 1905 was illegal. In 1926 the case was finally settled in favor of the oil company.

== See also ==
- List of cemeteries in Hudson County, New Jersey
