= Rutowski Park =

Municipal park and preserve in Bayonne, New Jersey

Rutkowski Park
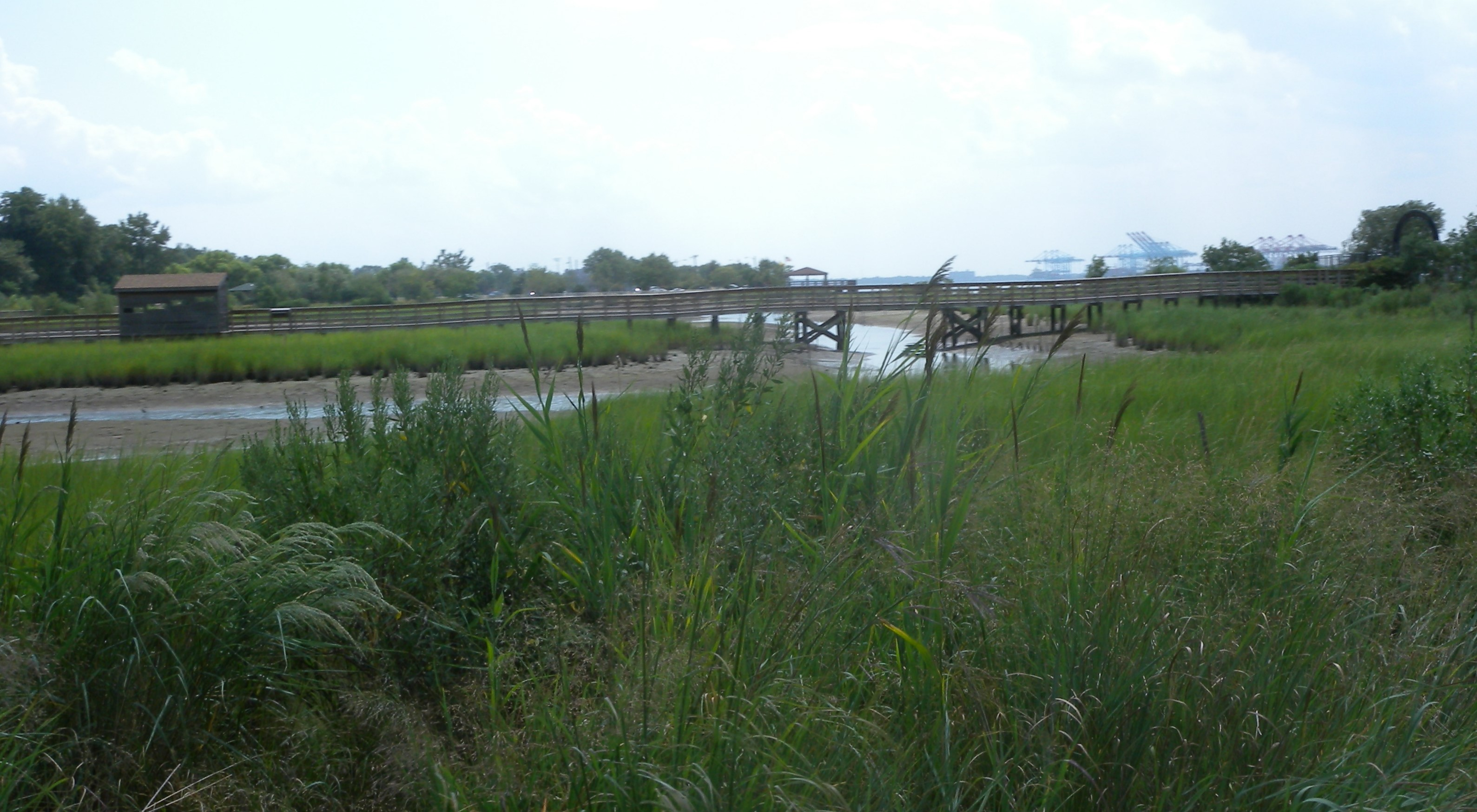

- Location within Hudson County, New Jersey
- Location: Bayonne, New Jersey
- Coordinates: 40°41′19″N 74°6′40″W
- Area: 40 acres (0.16 km^{2})
- Opened: 2006

Rutkowski Park is a municipal park and preserve in Bayonne, New Jersey. It is located at the northwestern end of the city near the mouth of the Hackensack River at Newark Bay south of New Jersey Route 440. It is a component of the Hackensack RiverWalk and is connected by footpath to Stephen R. Gregg Park—Hudson County Park. The park encompasses 40 acres (0.16 km^{2}). and includes a boardwalk through the wetlands preservation area and remnants of the Electric Launch Company. Opened in 2006, it is named for former Mayor of Bayonne (1990–1994), Richard Rutkowski.
