= 16th Street Park =

Park in Bayonne, New Jersey, USA

Dominico – 16th Street Park
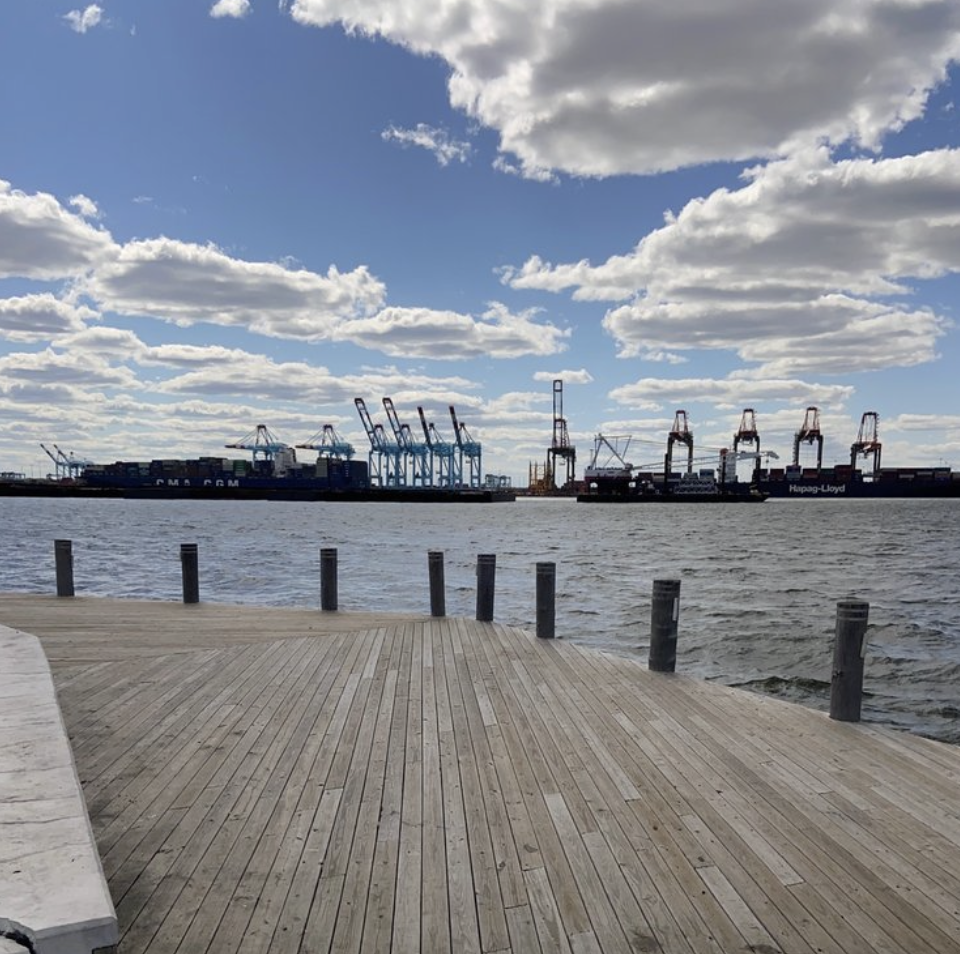
- View of Port Newark-Elizabeth from park

- Location within Hudson County, New Jersey
- Interactive map of Dominico – 16th Street Park
- Location: Bayonne, New Jersey
- Coordinates: 40.66337°N 74.1312°W
- Operator: City of Bayonne

16th Street Park, also known as Dominico – 16th Street Park, is a municipal park in Bayonne, New Jersey. It is located on the west side of the city along the Newark Bay across from Port Newark–Elizabeth Marine Terminal. It is a component of the Hackensack River Greenway.

== History ==
The park was developed as a Works Progress Administration project.

The park is named in dedication to G. Thomas DiDomenico, who was mayor of Bayonne from 1955–1959.

In 2016 funding was provided for the creation of a 700-foot-long stretch of waterfront south of the main park for a rocky beachfront and elevated eight foot wide boardwalk.

In 2022, a memorial bench to honor Jersey City Police detective Joseph A. Seals who lost his life in connection to the 2019 Jersey City shooting, was created.

== Facilities ==
An amphitheatre, the municipal pool (1997), a firing range, and a boat launch can be found at the park. There are courts for handball, tennis, basketball, volleyball and pickleball as well as fields for baseball, softball, and soccer. Walking paths, a boardwalk, and kayak launch are found along the Hackensack River Greenway.

== See also ==
- Collins Park (Bayonne, New Jersey)
- Hudson County Park System
