= Egbert Seymour =

American politician (1850–1921)

6th Mayor of Bayonne
- In office 1895–1904
- Preceded by: William C. Farr
- Succeeded by: Thomas Brady

Personal details
- Born: December 15, 1850 Walkill, New York, U.S.
- Died: February 6, 1921 (aged 70) Bayonne, New Jersey, U.S.
- Party: Democrat
- Spouse: Marietta H. Neafie

Egbert Seymour (December 15, 1850 – February 6, 1921) was the 6th mayor of Bayonne, New Jersey, from 1895 to 1904.

== Biography ==
Born December 15, 1850, in Walkill in upstate New York, Seymour came to Bayonne, New Jersey in the 1880s and became active in Democratic Party politics. He was elected mayor in 1895, defeating incumbent Republican mayor William C. Farr who was seeking a third term. On April 11, 1899, Seymour was elected to a second term. In 1905, Seymour ran for Hudson County sheriff, but was upset in the election by Republican John C. Kaiser. After this, Seymour withdrew from public service.

Seymour ran a butter and egg business in New York City. He was one of the founders of the Bayonne Democratic Club. He was also a leader of the Volunteer and Exempt Firemen of Bayonne. He was chairman of the Board of Directors of Bayonne Hospital.

Seymour died on February 6, 1921, in his home of influenza at age 70. He is buried in Bayview – New York Bay Cemetery in Jersey City. Coincidentally, Farr, who he defeated as mayor, died of influenza eight days later.

Preceded by William C. Farr	Mayors of Bayonne; 1895–1904	Succeeded by Thomas Brady
