= Matthew T. Cronin =

American mayor

10th Mayor of Bayonne
- In office 1912–1914
- Preceded by: John J. Cain
- Succeeded by: Dr. Bert J. Daly

Personal details
- Born: September 1868 New Jersey, United States
- Died: October 23, 1931 (aged 63) Bayonne, New Jersey, US
- Party: Democrat
- Spouse: Mae Elizabeth McCurry

Matthew T. Cronin (September 1868 – October 23, 1931) was an American politician. Cronin served in office from 1912 to 1914 as the 10th mayor of Bayonne, New Jersey. As mayor of Bayonne, he was succeeded by Bert J. Daly.

== Political career ==
Cronin succeeded John J. Cain in the Democratic primaries and went on to win the general election for mayor of Bayonne, New Jersey. Most notably, he was responsible in improving Bayonne's water supply during his term. He ran for a second term as Bayonne's mayor but ultimately lost to Bert J. Daly in the democratic primaries. Daly went on to become the 11th mayor of Bayonne.

== Personal life ==
Cronin was a member of the Roman Catholic Church. His wife was Mae Cronin (née Mae Elizabeth McCurry).

=== Death and burial ===
Cronin died in his home on 23 October 1931. His funeral mass was held at St. Vincent's Roman Catholic Church in Bayonne. He was interred at the Holy Cross Cemetery, a Roman Catholic cemetery located at 3620 Tilden Avenue, East Flatbush, Brooklyn, New York City.

Preceded by John J. Cain	Mayors of Bayonne; 1912–1914	Succeeded by Dr. Bert J. Daly
