= Holy Name Cemetery (Jersey City, New Jersey) =

Roman Catholic cemetery in New Jersey, US

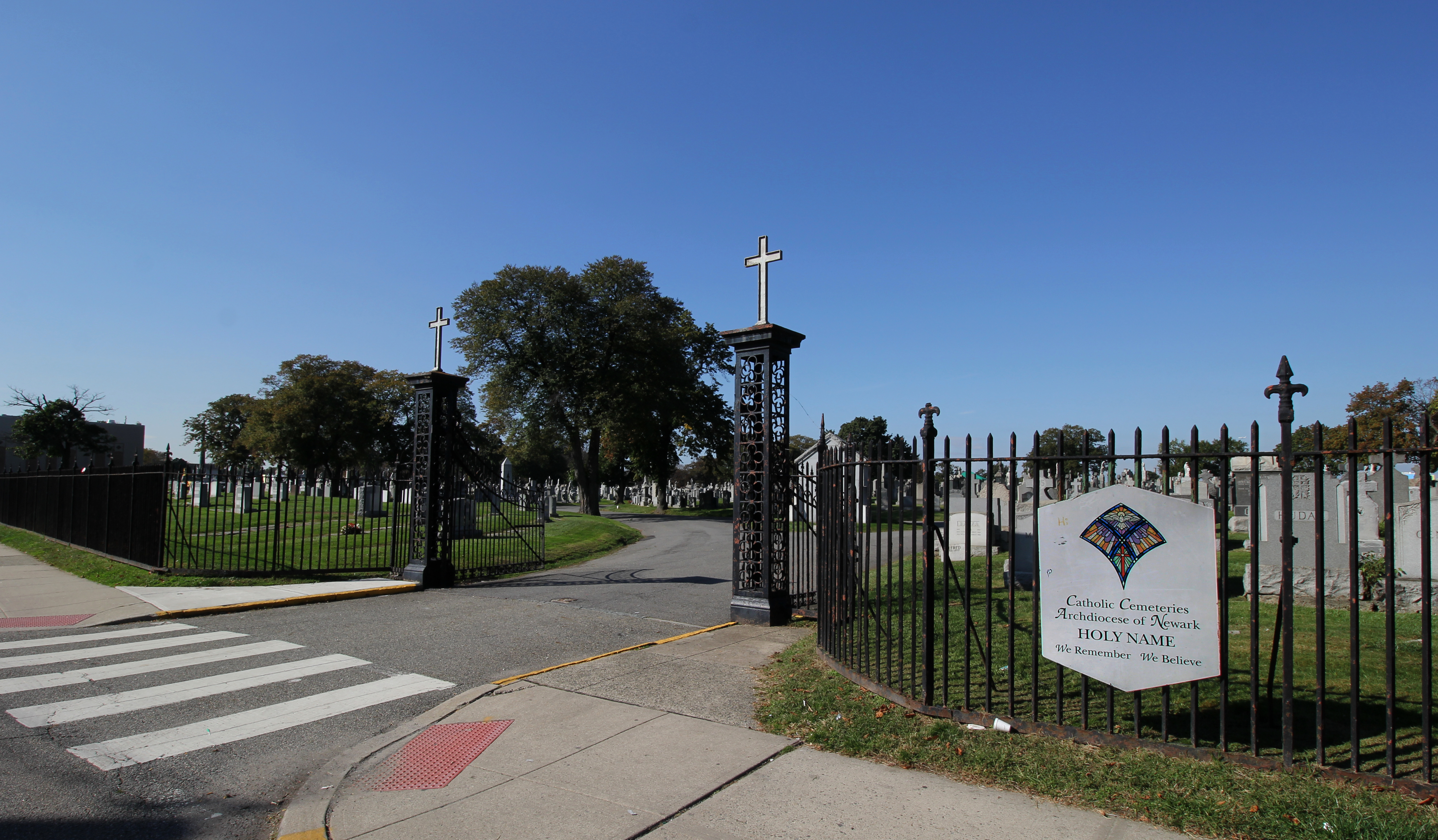
- West Side Avenue entrance
- Interactive map of Holy Name Cemetery

Details
- Established: 1866
- Location: Jersey City, New Jersey
- Country: US
- Coordinates: 40.7317°N 74.0794°W
- Type: Catholic
- Owned by: Roman Catholic Archdiocese of Newark
- Size: 63 acres (250,000 m^{2})
- No. of graves: 264,984 burials
- Website: Official website
- Find a Grave: Holy Name Cemetery

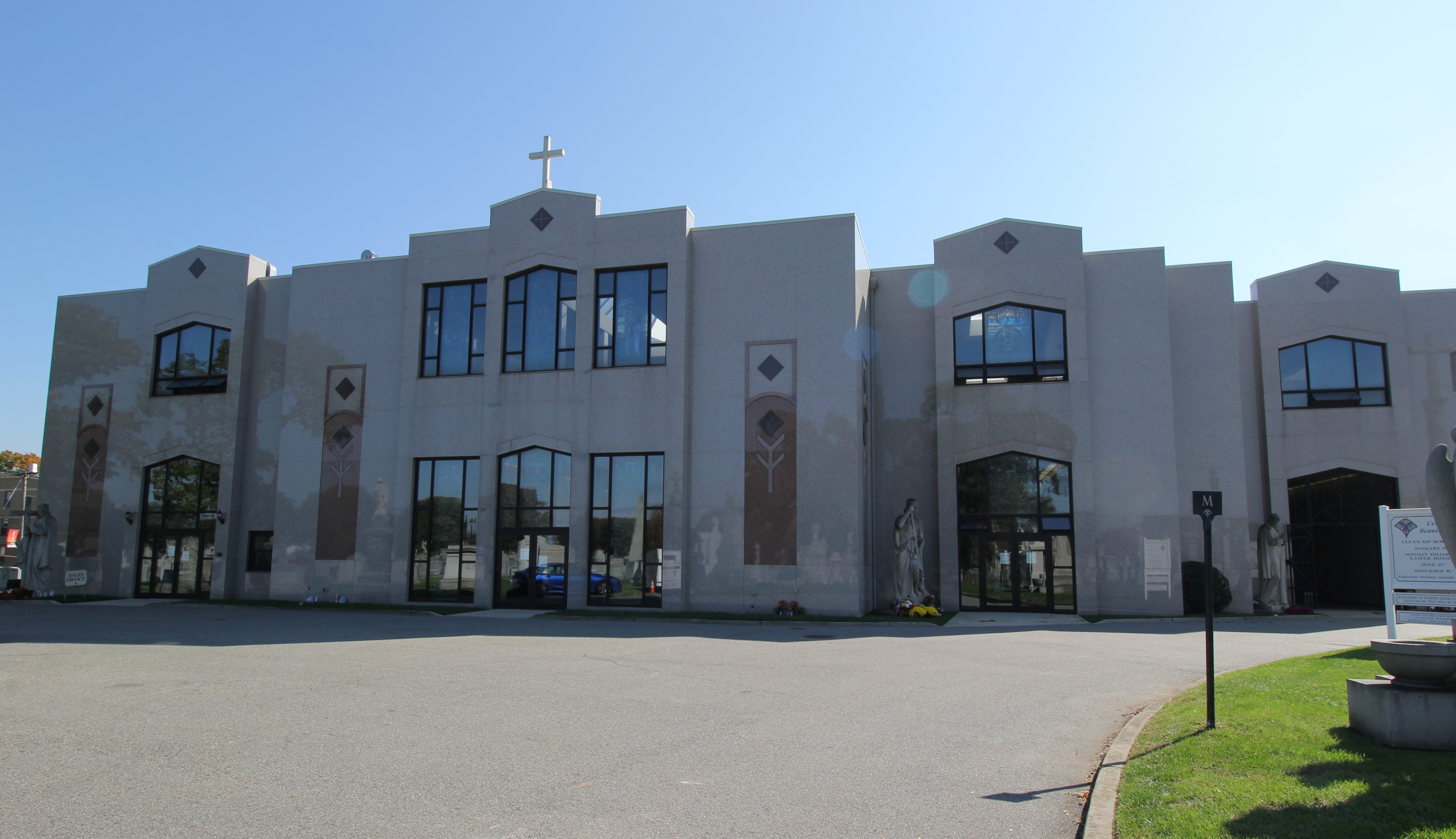
Holy Name Cemetery office building

Holy Name Cemetery is a Catholic cemetery in Jersey City, New Jersey administered by the Archdiocese of Newark.

== Description ==
It was established in 1866 and at the end of calendar year 2002 has accepted 264,984 burials. The cemetery parcel is 63 acres (250,000 m^{2}) and all but 0.3 acres (1,200 m^{2}) has been developed and sold for burials. It is an active cemetery providing services to Catholic families.

== Notable burials ==
- James J. Donovan (1890–1971), Mayor of Bayonne, New Jersey 1939–43.
- Mark M. Fagan (1869–1955), Mayor of Jersey City, New Jersey
- Frank Hague (1876–1956), Mayor of Jersey City, New Jersey
- James A. Hamill (1877–1941), US Congressman
- Mickey Hughes (1866–1931), 19th-century Major League Baseball pitcher for the Brooklyn Bridegrooms.
- John V. Kenny (1894–1975), Mayor of Jersey City, New Jersey
- Michael McNamara (1839–1907), Marine Corps Medal of Honor recipient
- Mary Teresa Norton (1875–1959), served 13 consecutive terms in the United States House of Representatives, from 1925 to 1951
- Charles F. X. O'Brien (1879–1940), US Congressman
- Thomas F. X. Smith (1928–1996), Mayor of Jersey City, New Jersey
- Charles Stoneham (1876–1936), sports teams and racetrack owner
- T. James Tumulty (1913–1981), US Congressman

== See also ==
- List of cemeteries in Hudson County, New Jersey
