= Constable Hook =

Populated place in Hudson County, New Jersey, US

Coordinates: 40.661°N 74.118°W

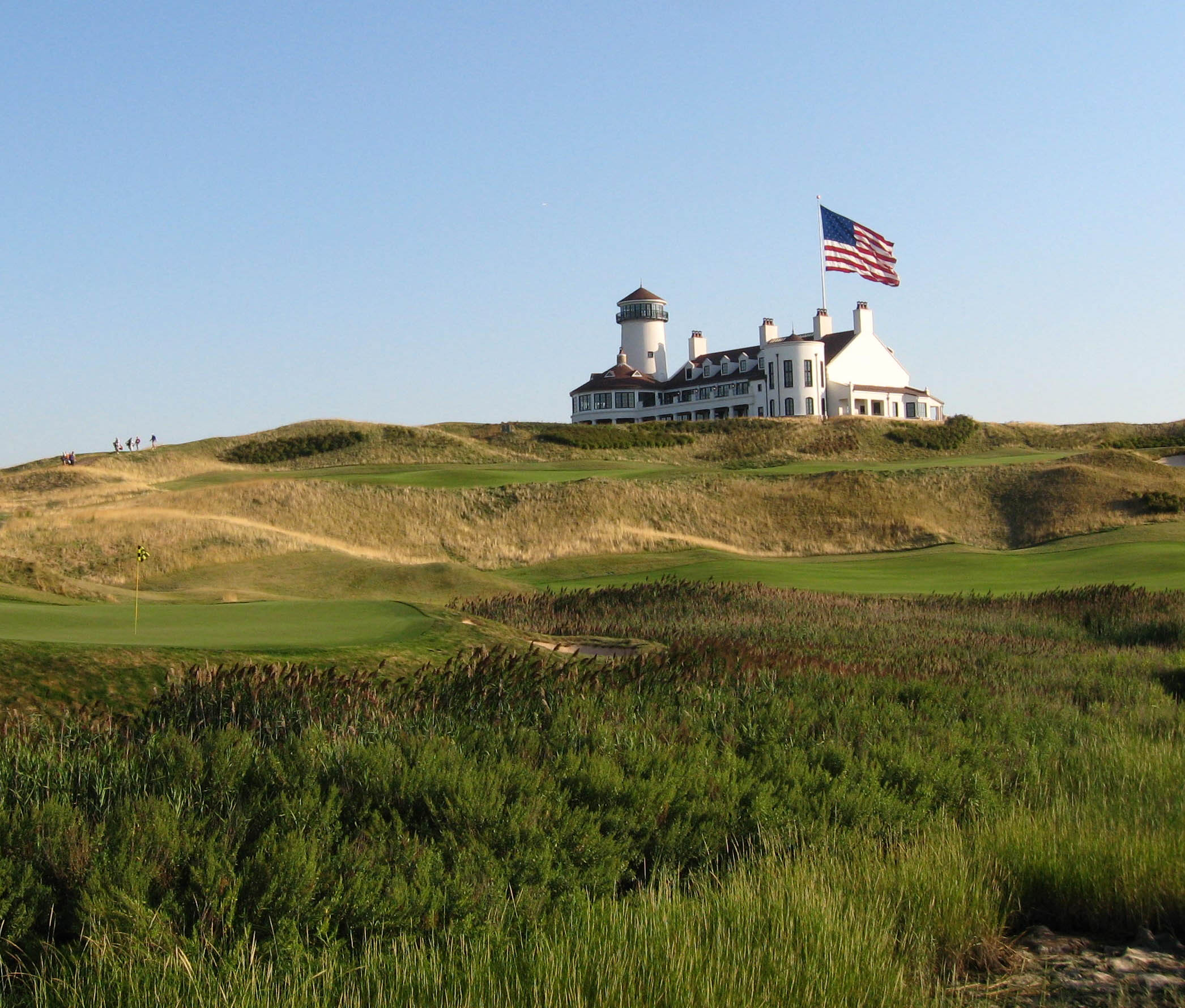
Bayonne Golf Club

Constable Hook is a cape on the north side of the outlet of Kill van Kull into Upper New York Bay in Bayonne, New Jersey. The cape has long been an important site of marine transfer operations in the Port of New York and New Jersey. Just offshore, Robbins Reef Light guides harbor traffic. Since the late 20th century, brownfields have been repurposed for recreational and commercial uses.

Historically, the name Constable Hook was used more broadly, synonymous with Bergen Point as defining the southern extent of Bergen Neck and of Bergen Township when established in 1693. On March 15, 1861, the New Jersey Legislature approved unification of Constable Hook along with Bergen Point, Centerville, and Salterville into the Township of Bayonne. Three weeks later, the Charter for the City of Bayonne was signed by Governor Charles S. Olden.

== History ==
=== Van Buskirk family ===
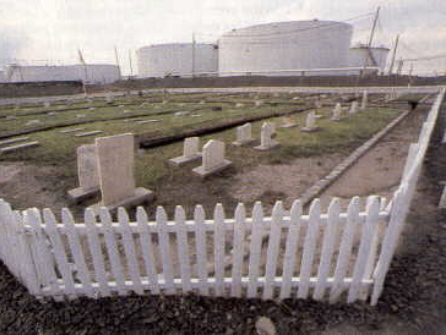

In 1646, the Dutch West India Company, under the leadership of Director-General William Kieft, gave a land grant to Jacob Jacobsen Roy, a chief gunner or constable in Fort Amsterdam in New Amsterdam. the capital of New Netherland. The area, "Konstapel's Hoeck" in Dutch, takes its name from Roy's title. Roy never cultivated or settled on the land.

The first settler is believed to be Pieter Van Buskirk (Boskerck). Born around January 1, 1665, Van Buskirk built a stone house overlooking Upper New York Bay on Constable Hook at what became known as Van Buskirk's Point around the year 1700. Van Buskirk started a small family cemetery next to his house in 1736. His wife, Tryntje died on October 31 of that year and was buried in the cemetery. Pieter Van Buskirk died two years later on July 20, 1738 and was also buried in the cemetery.

In 1798, Van Buskirk descendants sold a portion of Constable Hook to the Hazard Powder Co. that built a factory and dock. During the War of 1812, the Hazard Powder Co. factory produced gunpowder for the U.S. Navy and for fortifications in and around New York harbor.

In 1854 James J. Van Buskirk (1791–1856), wrote a will and mentioned 2 acres (8,100 m^{2}) of his land situated at Constable Hook off East 22 Street was to be reserved for a cemetery. The cemetery was not opened until December 1854 and plots in the cemetery were sold soon after. The official name of the cemetery is not known, but it was often referred to in documents as "Hook Cemetery", "Bayonne Cemetery", "Constable Hook", and is known as the "Bayonne Constable Hook Cemetery". The remaining parts of the cemetery underwent a restoration project of the 1980s. It is surrounded by property owned by IMTT and is also maintained by the company.

=== Port Johnston ===
The industrial Port Johnson area is located in the southwestern portion of Constable Hook. In 1864, after building a railroad bridge over Newark Bay, the Central Railroad of New Jersey laid railroad tracks through Bayonne into Constable Hook. After the American Civil War, they built the Port Johnston Coal Docks, at the time the largest coal port in the world. Many Irish immigrants took jobs with the railroad living in Constable Hook. So many Irish had moved there that the residents of Bayonne referred to the area as "Irishtown." On July 26, 1877, the first full scale strike occurred in Bayonne at the Port Johnston Coal Docks when workers walked off the job. Port Johnston was the site of a prisoner-of-war camp for Italian soldiers during WW2.

=== Refineries and tank farm-liquid storage ===
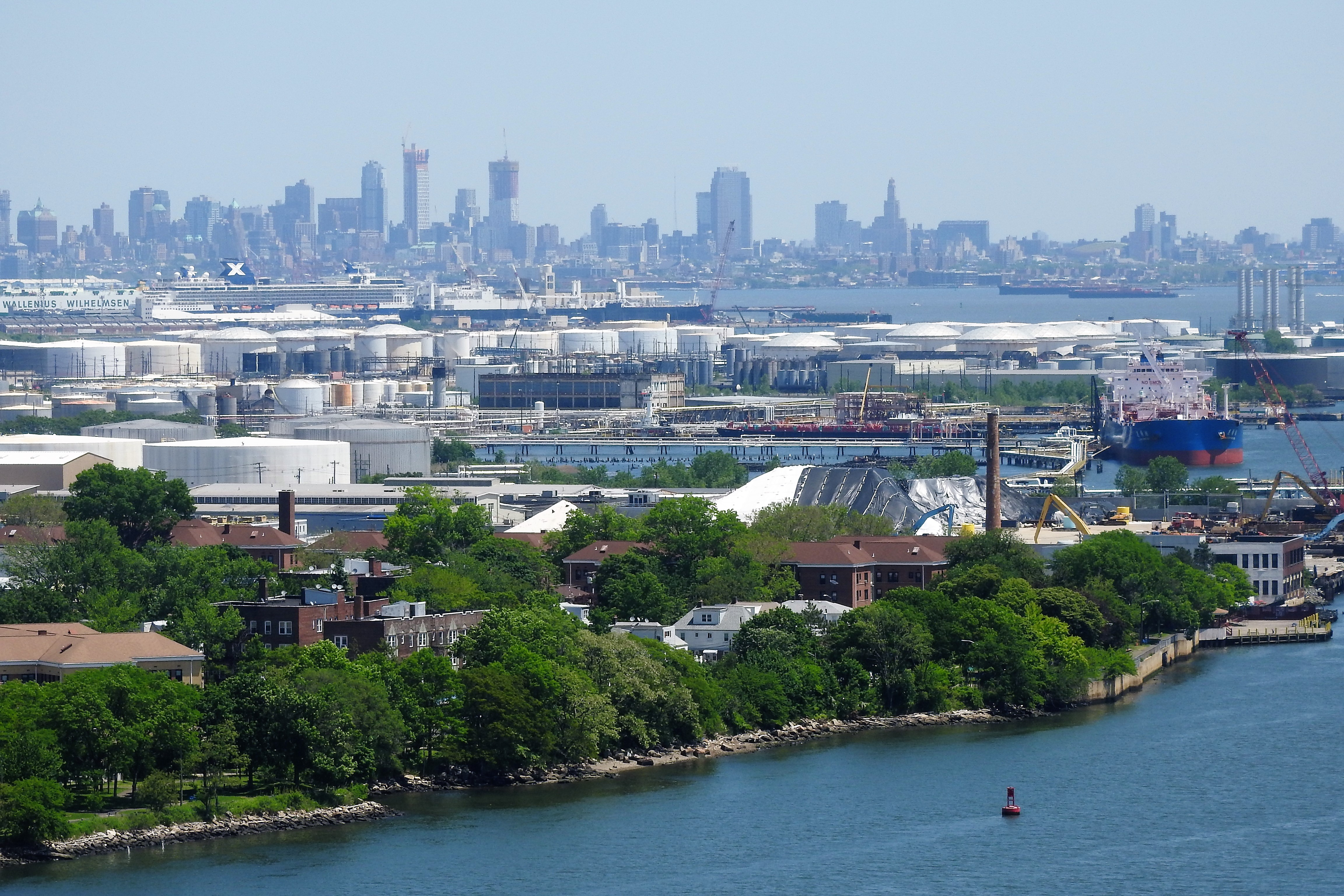
Industrial Constable Hook

In 1872, John D. Rockefeller's Standard Oil bought 176 acres of land on Constable Hook, and by 1885 there was a pipeline connecting it to the field of Texas. Three years later, Prentice Oil Company was also established at Constable Hook. This company was later sold to a subsidiary of the Pennsylvania Railroad called Empire Transportation Company, a competitor of Standard Oil. Other oil companies like Tidewater and Ocean Oil also built refineries on Constable Hook. The oil companies attracted Hungarian, Czech and Slovak immigrants from Eastern Europe.

The Van Buskirk farmhouse was demolished in 1906 by the Standard Oil Company, which owned the land and were expanding their refinery. Standard Oil has now refurbished the cemetery. On July 4, 1900, a fire broke out in the Standard Oil refinery. It started when lightning caused a number of the large oil tanks to explode. Flaming oil spread out into New York Bay. It took three days to extinguish the fire that in the end caused $2.5 million in damages yet only nine injuries.

During the Bayonne refinery strikes of 1915–1916 workers at the Standard Oil Company of New Jersey went on strike over wages and union organization. Bayonne police battled the strikers causing the death of one striker. A week later, on July 22, a riot broke out as gunfire would take the lives of four more men, one as young as 19, and injuring many others, one as young as twelve. A second strike would occur the following year. On October 10, a riot broke out that left three policeman and several strikes injured. As the riots continued in the streets, police and strikers traded gunfire and one woman was killed. The strike ended on October 19 as the strikers returned to work and Standard Oil agreed to give everyone a raise.

In 1983, a former Standard Oil facility at the southeastern portion of Constable Hook was purchased by IMTT, which operates a 450-acre (180 ha) bulk liquid handling facility there.

Exxon is responsible for clean-up of environmental damage caused by oil facilities, and has been the subject of extended litigation. As of 2015, Exxon has completed a soil investigation at the 324-acre terminal. It has until May 7, 2016, to finish its groundwater investigation under a bill passed unanimously by the New Jersey Legislature in late 2013 that gave polluters a deadline extension on investigating cleanups. according to the NJ DEP, clean-up at Constable Hook has included excavation, stabilization, capping, and the capturing of ground water contamination and installation of steel wall containment systems. The controversial ExxonMobil-New Jersey environmental contamination settlement was made during the governorship of Chris Christie.

=== Redevelopment projects ===
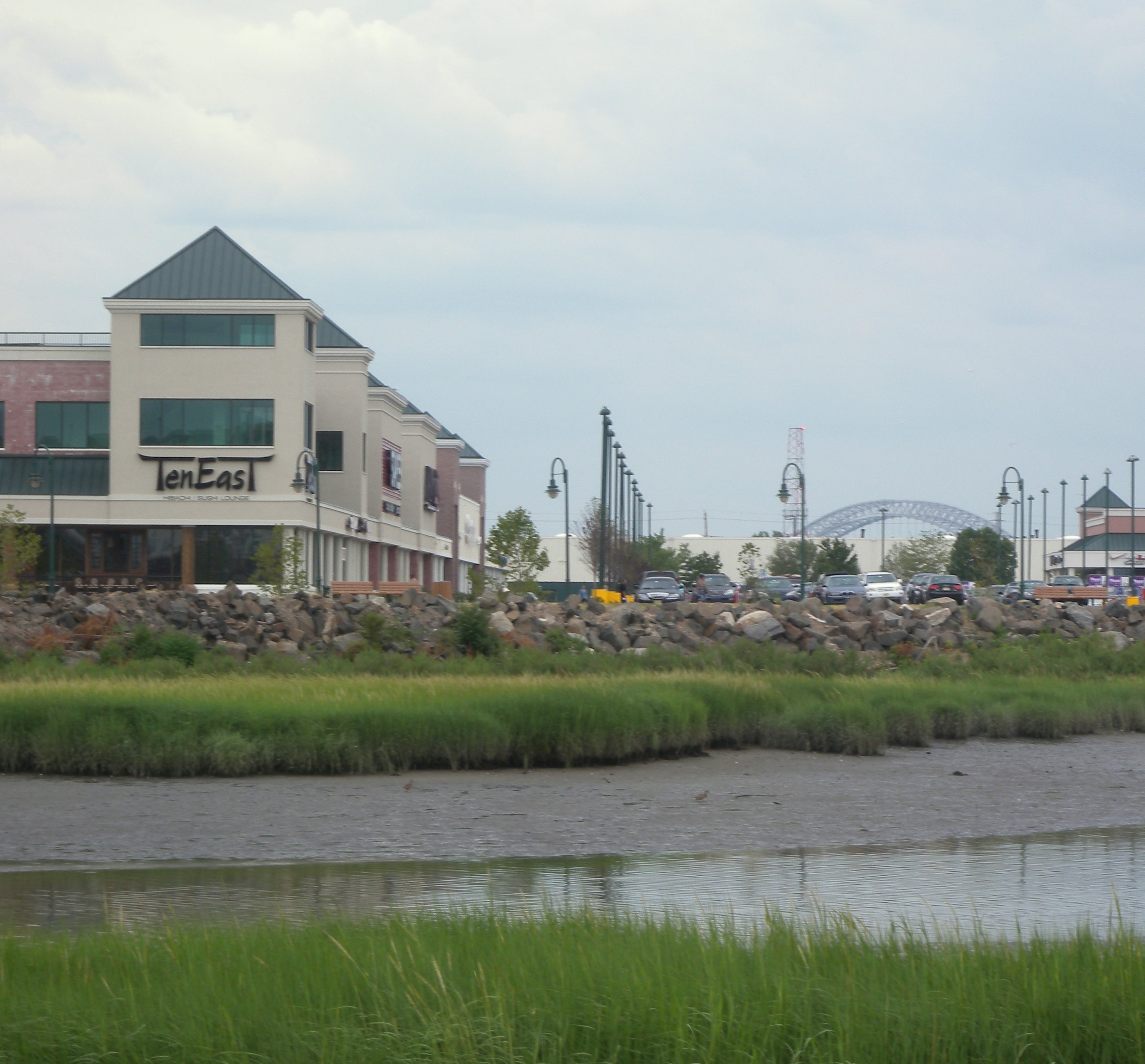
South Cove Commons mall

Most of eastern Constable Hook was the 20th century Bayonne city dump, and now belongs to the Bayonne Golf Club, including a recreated lighthouse on the highest hill on the cape, serving as its clubhouse. The north end has South Cove Commons, a late 20th-century shopping mall off Route 440, and a public shoreside nature walk east of there, affording views of tidal mudflats, the former Military Ocean Terminal at Bayonne, and New York Harbor. The Hudson River Waterfront Walkway runs along the northern shore of the cape. The Bayonne Energy Center opened in 2012.

== See also ==
- Bergen Neck
- Geography of New York–New Jersey Harbor Estuary
- Port of New York and New Jersey
- Port of Paulsboro
