= William C. Farr =

American mayor

5th Mayor of Bayonne, New Jersey
- In office 1891–1895
- Preceded by: John Newman
- Succeeded by: Egbert Seymour

Personal details
- Born: March 13, 1844 Gettenbach, Kurhessen, Germany
- Died: February 14, 1921 (aged 76) Bayonne, New Jersey, United States
- Party: Republican
- Spouse: Mary Dorethea Schmidt
- Children: Louise, Frederick, Dorothea, Elizabeth, Laura, Emma and Charles

William C. Farr (March 13, 1844 – February 14, 1921) was the fifth Mayor of Bayonne, New Jersey, from 1891 to 1895.

== Biography ==
Born on March 13, 1844, in Gettenbach, an old (since 1252), but small village in a large forest Buedinger Wald, then part of the Electorate of Hesse, near the Free City of Frankfurt. Farr immigrated to the United States in 1861. After arriving in Baltimore, Farr moved to Bayonne in 1862. On May 31, 1863, he married Mary Dorethea Schmidt; they had five children together. After a time operating a canal boat, Farr became successful in business running a contracting firm in Bayonne.

A Republican, he was nominated by both the Democratic Party and the Independent Party and was elected mayor of Bayonne, defeating incumbent Republican mayor John Newman in a highly contested election in 1891. Farr, who received the nomination of both the Democrats and the Republicans in 1893, easily won a second term. In Farr's two terms as mayor, he was instrumental in bringing water and electricity to Bayonne. Nominated for a third term in 1895, he lost to the Democrat Egbert Seymour in 1895. Farr retired from business a wealthy man. He donated money to a number of charities including the German Lutheran Hospital in Manhattan, New York City.

Farr died on February 14, 1921, in his home at age 77 of influenza. He is buried in Moravian Cemetery on Staten Island. Coincidentally, Seymour, his successor, had also died of influenza only eight days before.

Preceded by John Newman	Mayors of Bayonne; 1891–1895	Succeeded by Egbert Seymour
