= Port Johnston Coal Docks =

Docks in Bayonne, New Jersey, US

Coordinates: 40.651°N 74.115°W

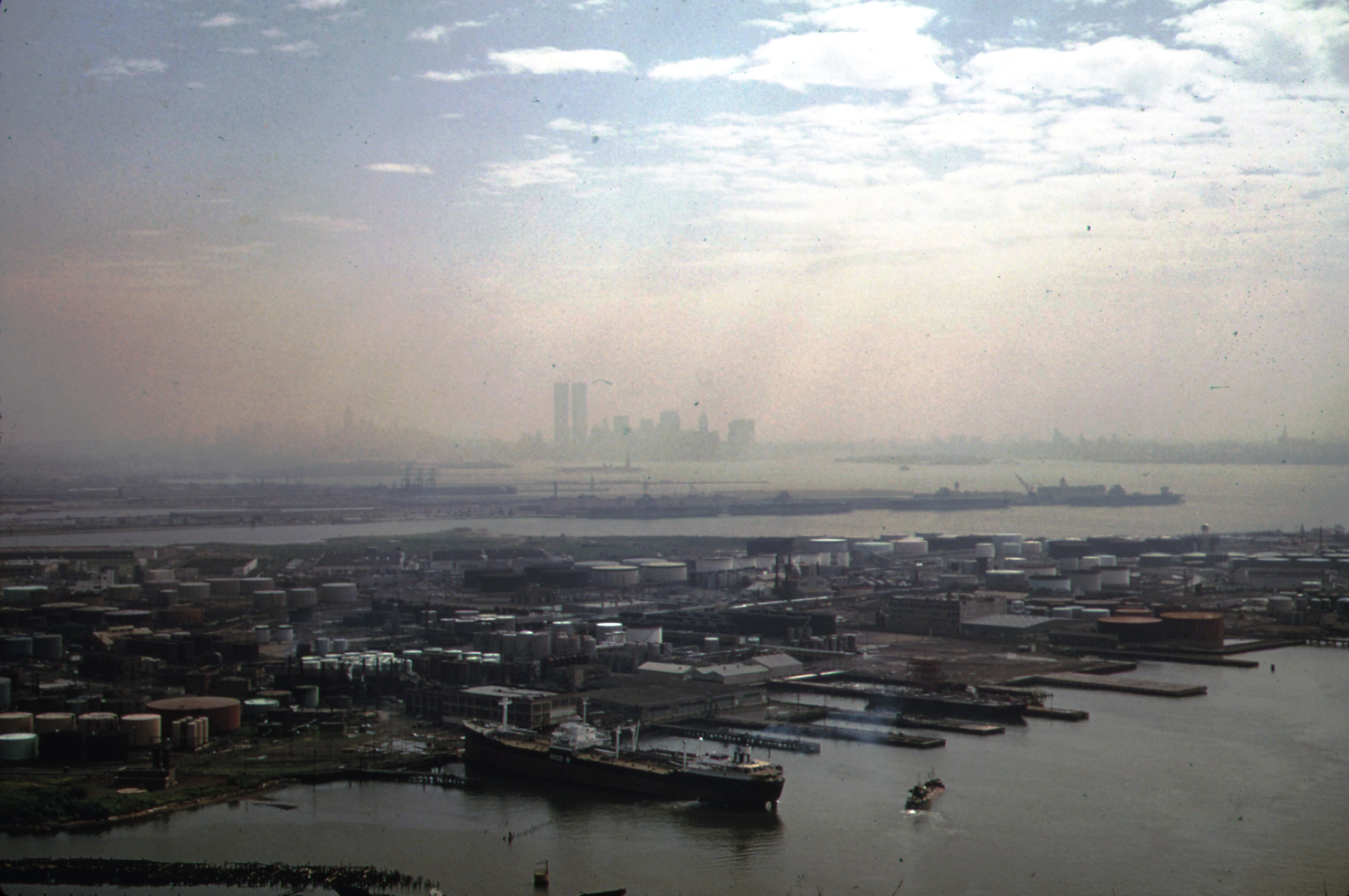
View of Bayonne, 1974. Decaying remains of a dock at Port Johnston are visible in the left foreground.

The Port Johnston Coal Docks were built on the Kill van Kull at Constable Hook in Bayonne, New Jersey in 1864 by the Central Railroad of New Jersey. The 2,750-foot (840 m) coal dock was named after the company's president John Taylor Johnston. (The former Johnston Yard and today's Johnston Avenue also bear his name). At the time of its completion in 1866, it was the largest coal dock in the world and employed 200 men, mostly Irish immigrants. Their job was to empty coal from railroad cars onto barges for shipment across Upper New York Bay to New York.

On July 26, 1877, the first full-scale strike occurred in Bayonne at the Port Johnston Coal Docks when workers walked off the job. The Lehigh and Wilkesbarre Coal Company, who had bought the coal docks from the Central Railroad of New Jersey in 1876, had cut the wages of the workers in an effort to save money. The Lehigh and Wilkesbarre Coal Company promptly fired all of the workers and brought in German immigrants from New York City to work. A threat of a riot was averted with the intervention of Bayonne Mayor Henry Meigs, Jr. and Father Thomas Killeen of St. Mary's Church. After working a day at the lower wages, the German immigrants decided it was not worthwhile and quit. By early August, Meigs had worked out a solution with the company that ended the strike peacefully.

Port Johnston was the site of a prisoner-of-war camp for Italian soldiers during WW2.

The tank farms and marine transfer operations around Port Johnston have been operated by Gordon Terminal Service since 1966.
