= James J. Donovan =

American politician

James J. Donovan (1890-1971) was an American politician in Hudson County, New Jersey who served as the mayor of Bayonne from 1939-1943.

== Biography ==
Donovan was born in Bayonne on December 29, 1890.

Donovan served in the Medical Corp in World War I. He was awarded the Distinguished Service Cross (D.S.C.), the United States' second highest military honor, for his bravery at Grand Prix, France in October, 1918. He also received the Italian Cross from the Italian government at New York City Hall in 1919.

He died in Bayonne April 27, 1971 and is interred at Holy Name Cemetery (Jersey City, New Jersey).

== Political career ==
Donovan served twice as Hudson County Freeholder: 1935-39 and 1951-54. He served as mayor in between those terms.

He led the anti-Frank Hague movement on the home rule ticket, which emphasized Bayonne locals, not Jersey City politicians, running Bayonne. He was elected mayor by the largest margin in the history of Bayonne politics.

During his tenure the voters of Bayonne rejected a change in form of government.

In 1942, Donovan and his administration lobbied United States Naval officials to locate a base at the old port terminal in Bayonne, known as MOTBY. The base would become one of the most strategically important on the East coast, while providing many jobs for Bayonne citizens.

Donoovan was indicted for allowing vice in the city and was acquitted. He contended this prosecution was politically motivated by the Hague political machine.

== Legacy ==
In October 2009, the City Council of Bayonne passed a resolution to dedicate a park in Donovan's memory at the old Navy base site.
