= Stephen K. Lane =

American mayor

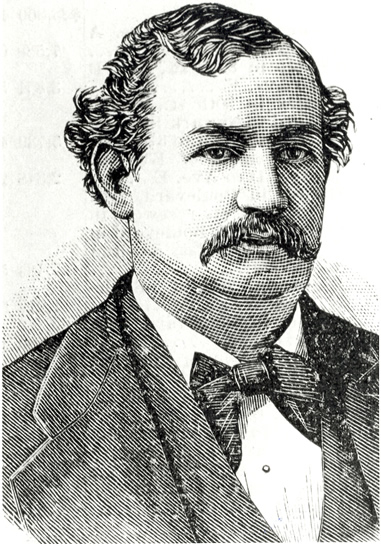

2nd Mayor of Bayonne
- In office 1879–1883
- Preceded by: Henry Meigs, Jr.
- Succeeded by: David W. Oliver

Personal details
- Born: November 2, 1833 Manhattan, New York City, US
- Died: November 14, 1896 (aged 63) Bayonne, New Jersey, US
- Political party: Republican
- Spouse: Euphemia Fox (m. 1856)
- Children: 5

Stephen Knowlton Lane (November 2, 1833 - November 14, 1896) was the Mayor of Bayonne, New Jersey from 1879 to 1883.

== Biography ==
Lane was born in Manhattan, New York City on November 2, 1833. He became a member of the New York Produce Exchange. He married Euphemia Fox of Natchez, Mississippi on February 6, 1856. Lane moved to Bayonne in 1858.

A Republican, Lane was elected as a councilman in 1876. Running unopposed in 1878, he was elected mayor of Bayonne succeeding Henry Meigs. Ward was re-elected in 1879 defeating Democrat councilman David W. Oliver. While mayor, Lane oversaw a project to bring water into Bayonne. His attempt at a third term ended when he lost to Oliver in 1883. Business problems forced him to retire from public service.

Lane died from heart failure at age 63, on November 14, 1896.

Preceded by Henry Meigs	Mayors of Bayonne; 1879–1883	Succeeded by David W. Oliver
