= Kill Van Kull =

Tidal strait between New York and New Jersey

Coordinates: 40.644°N 74.120°W

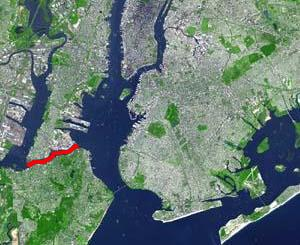
The Kill Van Kull (in red) connects Newark Bay and Upper New York Bay

Map of New York Harbor showing the location of the Kill Van Kull

The Kill Van Kull is a tidal strait between Staten Island, New York, and Bayonne, New Jersey, in the United States. It is approximately 3 miles (4.8 km) long and 1,000 feet (305 m) wide and connects Newark Bay with Upper New York Bay. The Robbins Reef Light is at the eastern end of the Kill, and Bergen Point marks its western end. It is spanned by the Bayonne Bridge and is one of the most heavily traveled waterways in the Port of New York and New Jersey.

Historically, it has been one of the most important channels for the commerce of the region, providing a passage for marine traffic between Upper New York Bay and the industrial towns of northeastern New Jersey. During the colonial era, it played a significant role in travel between New York and the southern colonies, with passengers transitioning from ferries to coaches at Elizabethtown (now Elizabeth).

Since the final third of the 20th century, it has provided the principal access for oceangoing container ships to Port Newark–Elizabeth Marine Terminal, the busiest port facility in the eastern United States, and Howland Hook Marine Terminal. The strait has required continued dredging and deepening to accommodate the passage of ever-larger ships. In many areas, the sandy bottom was excavated down to rock and required blasting. The Bayonne Bridge's deck was raised in 2017 so that New Panamax ships could travel the Kill Van Kull.

Collins Park in Bayonne is situated along the northern shore.

== Etymology ==
Kill Van Kull translates as "channel of the ridge" or "pass". Nearby is the Arthur Kill, the name of which is an Anglicization of the Dutch achter kill meaning "back channel", referring to its location "behind" Staten Island.

The name "Kill Van Kull" originated during the early 17th century, during the Dutch colonial era, when the region was part of New Netherland. Places were named by early explorers and settlers in reference to their shape, topography, or other geographic qualities. The area around Newark Bay was termed Achter Col. The bay lies behind Bergen Hill, the ridge of the Hudson Palisades which begins on Bergen Neck, the peninsula between it and the Upper New York Bay. Behind or achter the ridge was a col or mountain pass to the interior.

Kill comes from the Middle Dutch word kille meaning creek. Compare Dordtse Kil in the Netherlands. The bay was known as Cull Bay during the British colonial era.

== Gallery ==
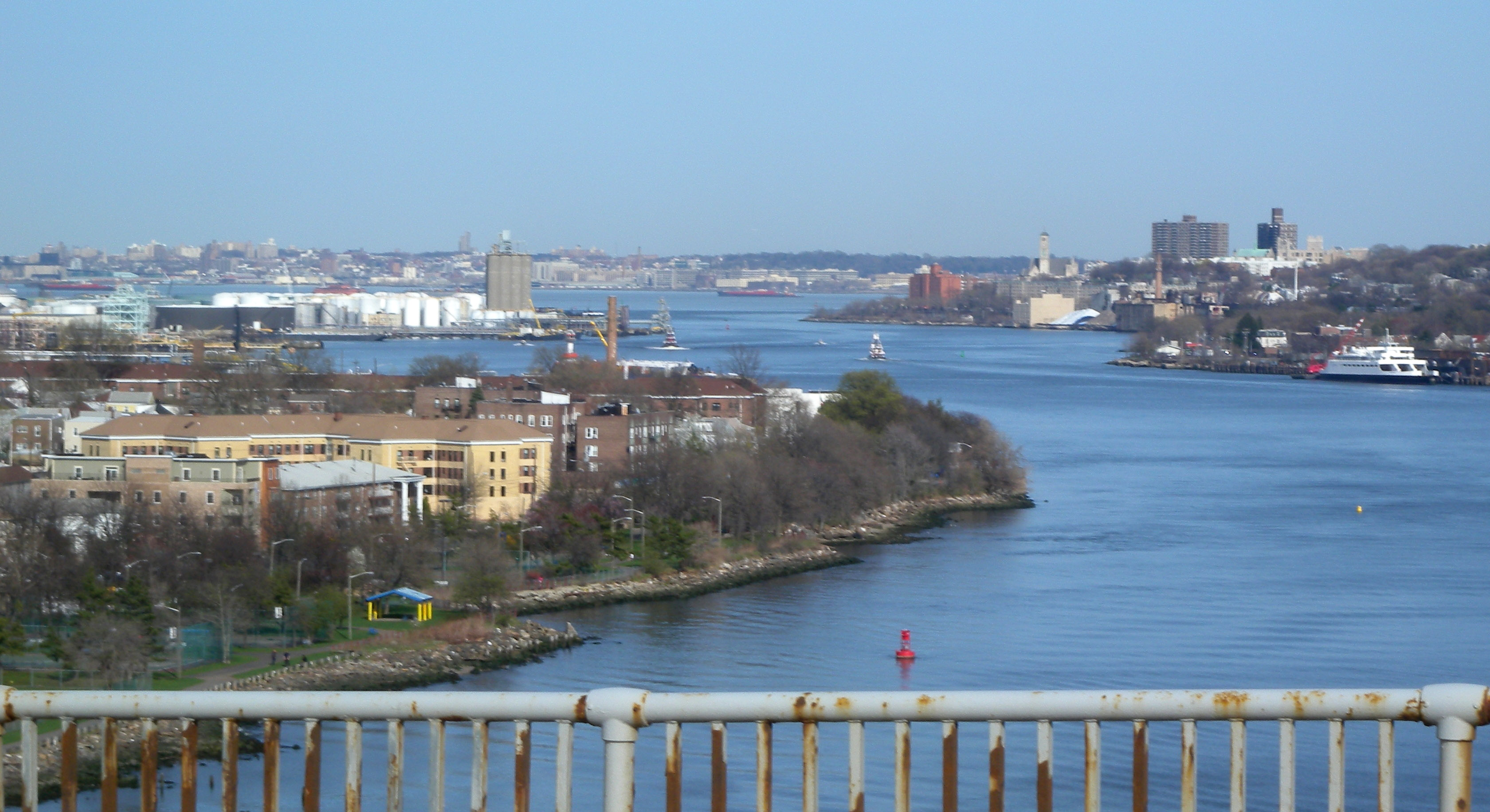
Western part of the Kill from the Bayonne Bridge

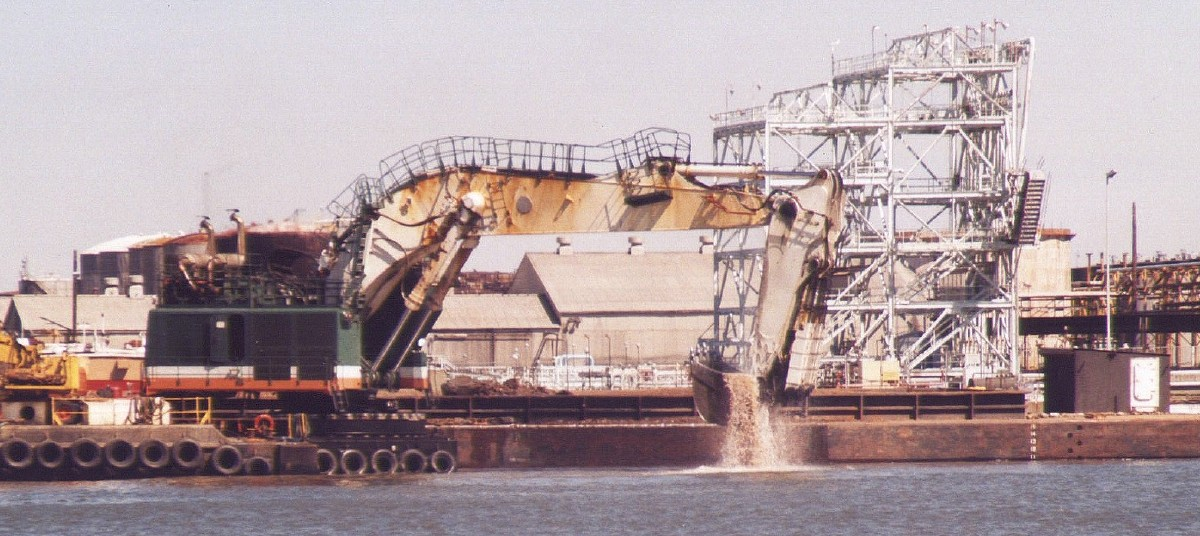
USACE dredge brings up blasted bedrock in widening the channel.

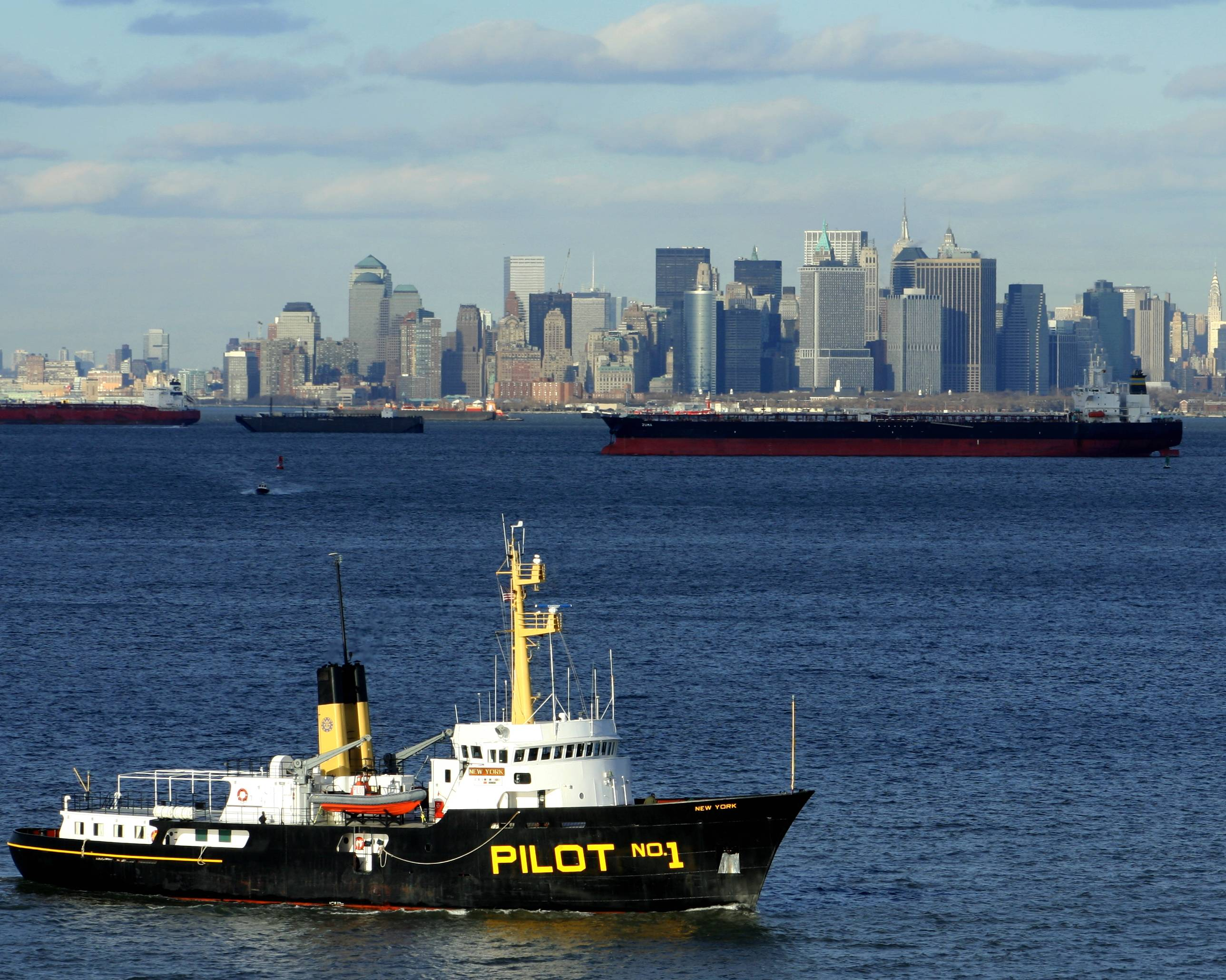
Ships in Upper New York Bay wait to enter the Kill.

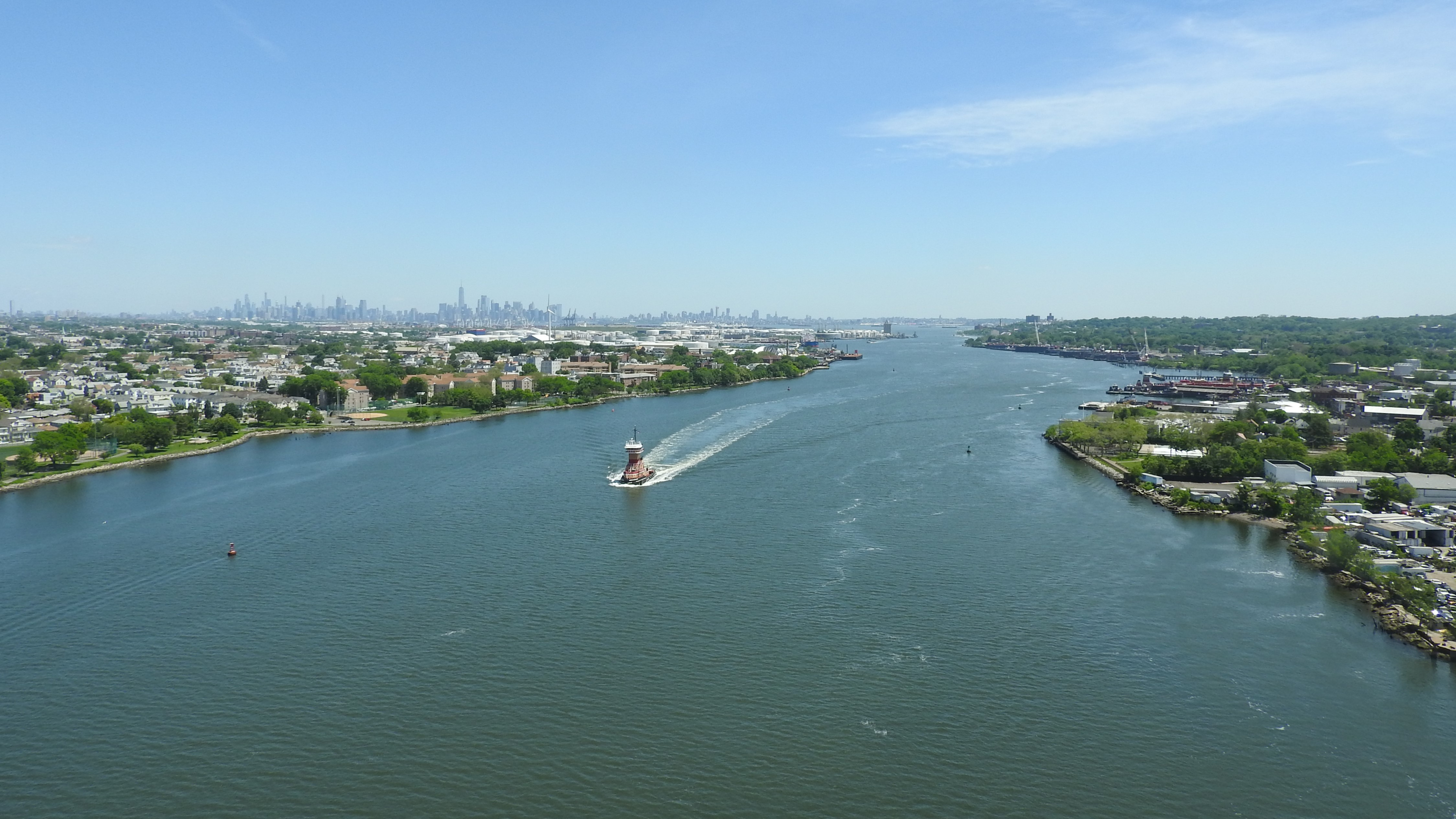
Eastern part of Kill Van Kull

== See also ==
- Port Richmond, Staten Island
- Port Johnston Coal Docks
- Geography of New York-New Jersey Harbor Estuary
- List of crossings of the Hackensack River
- List of crossings of the Lower Passaic River
- Sandy Hook Pilots
- Christopher O. Ward
