= Bayonne High School =

High school in Hudson County, New Jersey, US

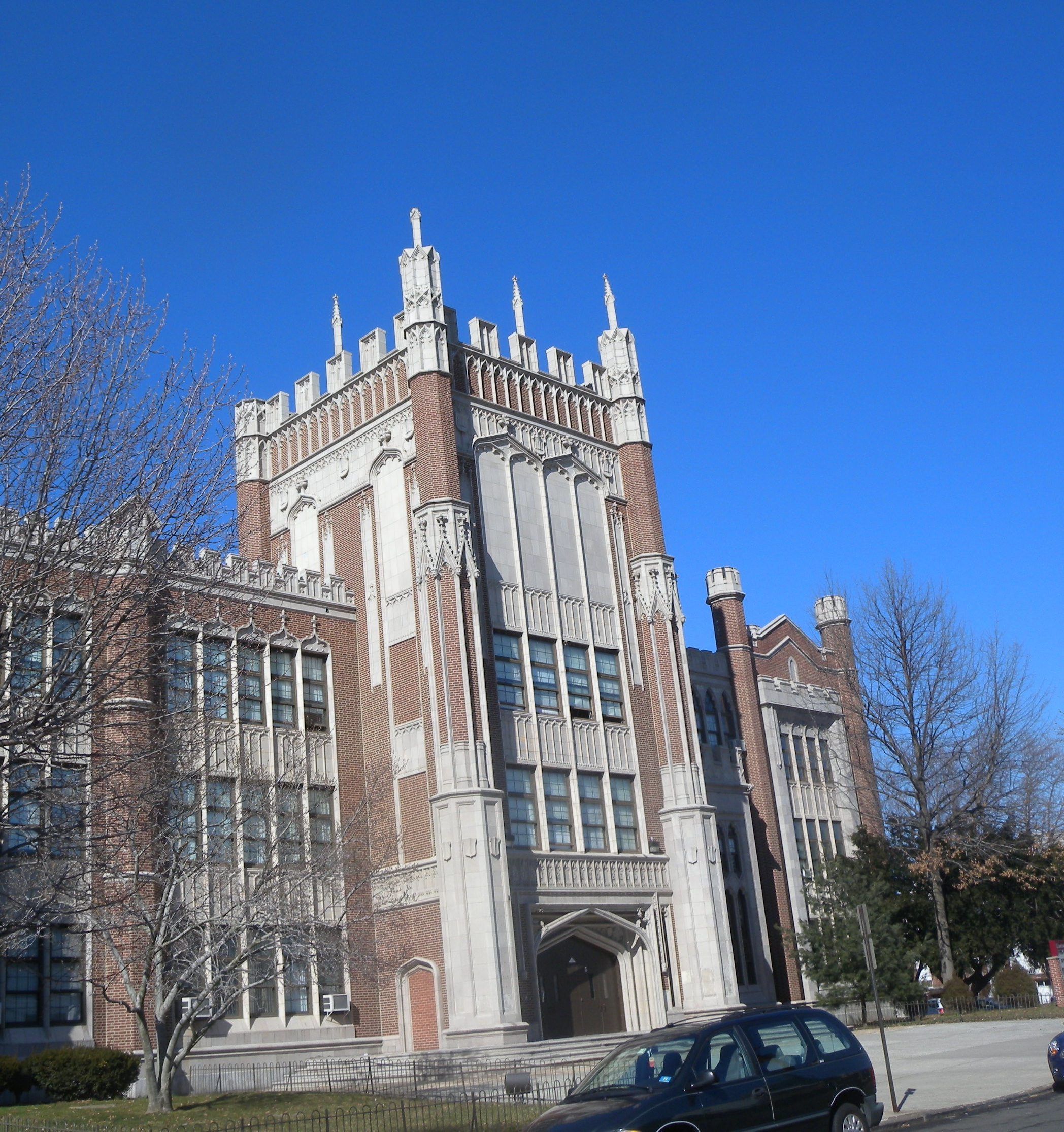

Location
- 669 Avenue A Bayonne, Hudson County, New Jersey 07002; United States; 40.67176°N 74.121234°W

Information
- Type: Public high school
- Established: 1936; 90 years ago
- School district: Bayonne Board of Education
- NCES School ID: 340126002704
- Principal: Keith Makowski
- Faculty: 239.0 FTEs
- Grades: 9-12
- Enrollment: 2,830 (as of 2024–25)
- Student to teacher ratio: 11.8:1
- Colors: Garnet and white
- Athletics conference: Hudson County Interscholastic League (general); North Jersey Super Football Conference (football)
- Team name: Bees
- Rival: St. Peter's Preparatory School
- Accreditation: Middle States Association of Colleges and Schools
- Publication: The Beacon
- Website: bhs.bboed.org

Bayonne High School (BHS) is a four-year comprehensive public high school serving students in ninth through twelfth grades in Bayonne, in Hudson County, in the U.S. state of New Jersey, operated by the Bayonne Board of Education.

As of the 2024–25 school year, the school had an enrollment of 2,830 students and 239.0 classroom teachers (on an FTE basis), for a student–teacher ratio of 11.8:1. There were 1,772 students (62.6% of enrollment) eligible for free lunch and 148 (5.2% of students) eligible for reduced-cost lunch. In the 2018–19 school year, the school's reported racial/ethnic make-up was 44% White (including Arab), 35% Hispanic, 13% Black, 7% Asian, and 1% Multiracial.

== History ==
The school was created in 1936, when the Sweeney Senior High School (officially Daniel P. Sweeney High School) and the Pulaski Vocational / Technical School were established. The technical school occupied what is now the vocational wing of BHS. The two schools were officially amalgamated in 1953. Since 1973, the school has been organized into six houses.

After an incident in 1997 in which two students were stabbed, one fatally wounded, the school instituted wide-ranging measures to reduce violence, from discussion groups to metal detectors. In 2000, it was reported to be known as a model of school safety. The school had been accredited until July 2022 by the Middle States Association of Colleges and Schools Commission on Elementary and Secondary Schools.

== Awards, recognition and rankings ==
For the 1995-96 school year, Bayonne High School was named a "Star School" by the New Jersey Department of Education, the highest honor that a New Jersey school can achieve.

The school was the 263rd-ranked public high school in New Jersey out of 339 schools statewide in New Jersey Monthly magazine's September 2014 cover story on the state's "Top Public High Schools", using a new ranking methodology. The school had been ranked 317th in the state of 328 schools in 2012, after being ranked 242nd in 2010 out of 322 schools listed. The magazine ranked the school 248th in 2008 out of 316 schools. The school was ranked 273rd in the magazine's September 2006 issue, which surveyed 316 schools across the state. Schooldigger.com ranked the school 219th out of 367 public high schools statewide in its 2009-10 rankings which were based on the combined percentage of students classified as proficient or above proficient on the language arts literacy and mathematics components of the High School Proficiency Assessment (HSPA).

== Academic offerings ==
Advanced Placement courses are offered in AP Biology, AP Physics, AP Precalculus, AP Calculus AB, AP English Language and Composition, AP English Literature and Composition, AP European History, AP Music Theory, AP Psychology, AP Computer Science Principles, AP Computer Science A, AP Statistics, AP Studio Art, AP Human Geography, AP United States Government and Politics and AP United States History. College credit can be earned through articulation agreements with New Jersey Institute of Technology, Rutgers University, Saint Peter's University and Seton Hall University.

== Campus ==
Bayonne High School is divided into six houses. The school is also home to an ice rink, and is the only public high school in the state to have an on-site ice rink for its hockey team. Located in the ice rink building are a gymnasium, offices, bathrooms, indoor track, and workout/ meeting rooms. The campus also has three gymnasiums, a planetarium, an in-house biological conservatory, a 600-seat auditorium, four tennis courts, a football stadium, and one baseball field. It borders the Newark Bay. The high school is sized for approximately 3,000 students.

== Athletics ==
The Bayonne High School Bees compete in the Hudson County Interscholastic League (HCIAA), which is composed of public and private high schools in Hudson County and was established following a reorganization of sports leagues in Northern New Jersey by the New Jersey State Interscholastic Athletic Association (NJSIAA). With 1,916 students in grades 10-12, the school was classified by the NJSIAA for the 2019–20 school year as Group IV for most athletic competition purposes, which included schools with an enrollment of 1,060 to 5,049 students in that grade range. The football team competes in the Liberty Red division of the North Jersey Super Football Conference, which includes 112 schools competing in 20 divisions, making it the nation's biggest football-only high school sports league. The school was classified by the NJSIAA as Group V North for football for 2022–2024, which included schools with 1,317 to 5,409 students.

Sports offered include:

- Boys: Baseball, Football, Basketball, Volleyball, Swimming, Soccer, Tennis, Wrestling, Hockey
- Girls: Softball, Volleyball, Basketball, Swimming (11 consecutive County Championship wins), Soccer, Tennis, Cheerleading (Over 6 national titles, two state titles)
- Co-ed: Fencing, Golf, Bowling, Stepping, Cross Country, Hockey, Indoor and Outdoor Track and Field

The boys' cross country team won the Group IV state title in 1946 and 1952.

The boys indoor track team won the public state championship in 1947.

The boys tennis team was the overall state champion in 1951, defeating runner-up East Orange High School 3-0 in the tournament final to bring their season record to 11-0 and extend the program's winning streak to 60 matches. The team had been in the HCIAA championship for 19 consecutive years, from 1993 to 2011. The team had won four consecutive titles from 1996 to 1999, and again from 2001 to 2004, and won their fifth consecutive county championship in 2011 with a 3-2 win over Secaucus High School in the tournament finals.

The boys' basketball team won the Group IV state championship in 1951, against runner-up Thomas Jefferson High School in the finals of the playoffs.

The baseball team won the Group IV state championship in 1973, defeating North Hunterdon High School in the tournament final.

In 1990, the girls soccer team was Group IV co-champion with East Brunswick High School.

The school's football team won the 2002 North I Group IV state championship, defeating Hackensack High School 25-23 in the championship game, for the school's first and only state championship to date in football.

The ice hockey team won the 1999-2000 public school state championship, with a 6-3 win over Summit High School at Continental Airlines Arena in East Rutherford, before falling by a score of 4-2 to Hudson Catholic Regional High School for the overall championship. The team won the McMullen Cup and The Monsignor Kelly Cup in 2017.

The boys volleyball team has been ranked in the top 10 in the state and won four straight HCIAA championships from 2006 to 2009 over their county rival St. Peter's Preparatory School, a streak broken by St. Peter's in 2010 final. In 2007 they reached the state final four before losing in the North Sectional to St. Peter's Prep. In 2008 they lost in the elite eight of the state tournament to Vernon Township High School in three games, despite being ranked #1 in the North. In 2009 they reached the state final four once again, only to be defeated by St. Peter's Prep again in the North final, 25-15, 25-23.

The 2023 girls' basketball team won the Group IV state championship with a 40–39 win in the tournament finals against Cherokee High School. In 2011, the team won their third consecutive Hudson County title with a 48-32 win over North Bergen High School.

== In popular culture ==
- The music videos "Waking the Demon" by the band Bullet for My Valentine, "Jeremy" by Pearl Jam, "Someday" by Mariah Carey, and "Popular" by Nada Surf were filmed on location at Bayonne High School.
- The school was used as a filming location for the 2009 film Assassination of a High School President.
- Scenes set at Flatpoint High in the 2006 film version of Strangers with Candy were shot at Bayonne High School.
- Matt Waters was a television show on CBS in 1996 that was filmed in Bayonne High School, starring Montel Williams.
- The 2002 movie Swimfan was filmed there.
- Episodes of The Adventures of Pete & Pete were filmed in the school.
- The movie Girl Haunts Boy was filmed at the school.

== Administration ==
The school's principal is Keith Makowski. Core members of the school's administration include the six vice principals, one assigned to each "house" within the school.

== Notable alumni ==
- Kenny Britt (born 1988), wide receiver for the New England Patriots and former star at Rutgers University
- Dick Brodowski (1932–2019), MLB pitcher
- Arthur F. Burns (1904–1987), chairman of the Federal Reserve
- Walter Chandoha (1920–2019), animal photographer, known especially for his 90,000 photographs of cats
- Stanley Chesney (1910–1978), soccer goalkeeper who was inducted into the National Soccer Hall of Fame
- Teresa Demjanovich (1901–1927), Roman Catholic Sister of Charity
- Rich Dimler (1956–2000), professional football player
- Michael Thomas Embrich (class of 2000), government official who was nominated in 2026 as the first Veteran Advocate of the State of New Jersey
- Sherif Farrag (born 1987), attorney who competed in the 2012 Summer Olympic Games as a foilist
- Barney Frank (1940–2026, class of 1957), U.S. congressman from Massachusetts from 1981 to 2013
- Adrienne Goodson (born 1966), former professional basketball player
- Danan Hughes (born 1970, class of 1988), wide receiver for the Kansas City Chiefs
- Frank Langella (born 1938), actor
- Joseph A. LeFante (1928–1997), represented New Jersey's 14th congressional district from 1977-1978
- Jammal Lord (born 1981), former safety for the Houston Texans
- Gene Olaff (1920–2017), early professional soccer goalkeeper inducted into the National Soccer Hall of Fame in 1971
- Nicholas Oresko (1917-2013), Medal of Honor recipient
- Ronald Roberts (born 1991), professional basketball player who played for Hapoel Jerusalem of the Israeli Premier League
- Steven V. Roberts (born 1943), journalist, author and political commentator
- William Sampson (born 1989, class of 2007), politician who has represented the 31st Legislative District in the New Jersey General Assembly since 2022.
- William Shemin (1896–1973), U.S. Army sergeant, Medal of Honor recipient and namesake of the William Shemin Midtown Community School
- William N. Stape (born 1968), screenwriter and magazine writer who wrote episodes of Star Trek: The Next Generation and Star Trek: Deep Space Nine
- Morris Warman (1918–2010), photographer
- Chuck Wepner (born 1939), heavyweight boxer
- Elliot Willensky (1943–2010), composer, lyricist and music producer
- Bill Wondolowski (1946–1994), professional football wide receiver who played for the San Francisco 49ers in the 1969 season
