= William J. Gallagher =

William J. Gallagher may refer to:

- Billy Gallagher (businessman) (c. 1869 – 1934), American restaurant owner
- William Gallagher (politician) (1875–1946), U.S. Representative from Minnesota
- William J. Gallagher (colonel), president of Riverside Military Academy in Gainesville, Georgia
