= Herbert Kupferberg =

- Born: January 1, 1918; New York City
- Died: February 22, 2001 (aged 83); New York City
- Known for: Music critic

Herbert Kupferberg (1918 – February 22, 2001) was an American music critic and senior editor of Parade magazine.

== Career ==
Kupferberg earned master's degree in English and journalism from Columbia University. For more than twenty years, he was an editor and critic for the New York Herald Tribune. After its demise in 1966, he joined Parade. He also wrote reviews for The Atlantic and the National Observer.

== Writing ==
He published several books, including Those Fabulous Philadelphians: The Life and Times of a Great Orchestra (1970) and Amadeus: A Mozart Mosaic (1986). Other books include:

- The Mendelssohns: Three Generations of Genius, 1972
- Felix Mendelssohn: His Life, His Family, His Music, 1972
- A Rainbow of Sound: The Instruments of the Orchestra and Their Music, with Morris Warman's photographs, 1973
- Tanglewood, 1976
- Opera, 1979
- Basically Bach: A 300th Birthday Celebration, 1985
- Book of Classical Music Lists, 1988

== Death ==
On February 22, 2001, Kupferberg died aged 83 in New York City.
