= Gene Olaff =

American soccer player (1920–2017)

Personal information
- Full name: Eugene A. Olaff
- Date of birth: September 23, 1920
- Place of birth: Bayonne, New Jersey, U.S.
- Date of death: January 17, 2017 (aged 96)
- Place of death: Florence, New Jersey, U.S.
- Height: 6 ft 1 in (1.85 m)
- Position: Goalkeeper

Youth career
- 1933–1935: Bayonne Rangers juniors

Senior career*
Years	Team	Apps	(Gls)
1935–1936	Bayonne Rangers		
1936–1937	New York Brookhattan		
1937–1939	Hatikvoh		
1939–1941	Swedish F.C.		
1941–1953	Brooklyn Hispano		

International career
1949	United States	1	(0)
- * Club domestic league appearances and goals

Eugene A. Olaff (September 23, 1920 – January 17, 2017) was an American soccer goalkeeper. He played in the National Soccer League of New York and the American Soccer League. Olaff also earned one cap with the United States in 1949. Prior to his death, he resided in Florence Township, New Jersey.

== Youth ==
Olaff's father was a Swedish seaman who emigrated to the United States. He joined the U.S. National Guard in order to gain U.S. citizenship and married Irene MacGregor. Olaff was born in 1920 and his sister in 1927. After his mother died in 1937, the year Olaff graduated from high school, and his father in 1941, Olaff took on the responsibility of raising his younger sister while also marrying in 1941.

== Soccer career ==
=== Youth ===
By the time he was married in 1941, Olaff had established himself as an accomplished goalkeeper. He began playing organized soccer with the semi-professional Bayonne Rangers’ youth team in 1933 with his size leading to his being put in the net. While playing for the Rangers, Olaff also competed with the Bayonne High School soccer team, graduating to the Rangers’ senior team by the time he finished high school.

=== Professional ===
In 1936, Olaff left the Rangers to sign with the professional New York Brookhattan of the American Soccer League (ASL). He spent a season on Brookhattan's reserve team, never seeing first team action, before moving to Hatikvoh F.C. of the National Soccer League of New York (NSL) in 1937. In 1939, Hatikvoh won the league cup. In 1939, he moved to Swedish F.C. of the NSL where he won a second league cup in 1940. The next season, Olaff moved back to the ASL, this time with Brooklyn Hispano. Olaff and his teammates won the 1943 National Challenge Cup. In 1944, Olaff gained his first double when Hispano won its second National Cup in addition to a league title. Olaff's professional career took a hit with the entry of the U.S. into World War II. He joined the U.S. Navy, becoming a diver. While he was able to continue playing with Hispano while also serving in the Navy, in the fall of 1944, he was deployed to Bari, Italy. He returned to New Jersey in 1946, but was hired by the New Jersey State Police. At the time, members of the State Police were required to live in barracks. In order to continue to play with Hispano, Olaff needed to request a pass each weekend. Despite this limitation, he remained with Hispano and won the 1946 Lewis Cup. In May 1946 he twice played against a touring Liverpool side, representing the New York region and the American Soccer League. Liverpool manager George Kay told the Liverpool Echo newspaper that he was good enough for the English 1st Division but there was no chance of persuading him to give up a police career that allowed him to retire on a pension at the age of fifty. He retired from football in 1953.

=== National team and the 1950 FIFA World Cup ===
Olaff earned one cap with the United States in a 4–0 loss to Scotland on June 19, 1949. He also played an unofficial game in 1948 against Israel. As the U.S. began preparations for the upcoming 1950 FIFA World Cup, the national team coach approached Olaff about joining the U.S. team. Olaff was forced to decline the invitation as the State Police refused to approve his request for a leave of absence.

=== Attire ===
When Olaff began playing, Stanley Chesney was the dominant U.S. goalkeeper. Olaff imitated Chesney in both his style of play and attire, a baseball cap and pants

== Non-soccer career ==
Throughout his life, Olaff held a number of jobs to supplement the meager pay, ranging from nine to thirty dollars per game, for playing soccer. This included time as a janitor, shipping clerk and a metal finisher with General Motors.

During World War II, Olaff joined the U.S. Navy, becoming a diver. He spent his first year in the navy attending diving schools on the east coast, allowing him to continue competing with Hispano. In 1944, he was deployed to Italy to conduct salvage operations in the Adriatic and was discharged from the Navy in March 1946.

After leaving the Navy, Olaff was hired by the New Jersey State Police. During his nearly 30 years with the State Police, Olaff was an academy instructor, deputy superintendent, chief of staff and finally, superintendent in 1975. He also created the police underwater unit using his wartime experience.

In 1978, Olaff was hired by D.B. Kelly Associates, a newly established security firm. He remained with D.B. Kelly until at least 1996.

Olaff was inducted into the National Soccer Hall of Fame in 1971. He died in January 2017 at the age of 96.
