= Bayonne Truck House No. 1 =

- U.S. National Register of Historic Places
- New Jersey Register of Historic Places
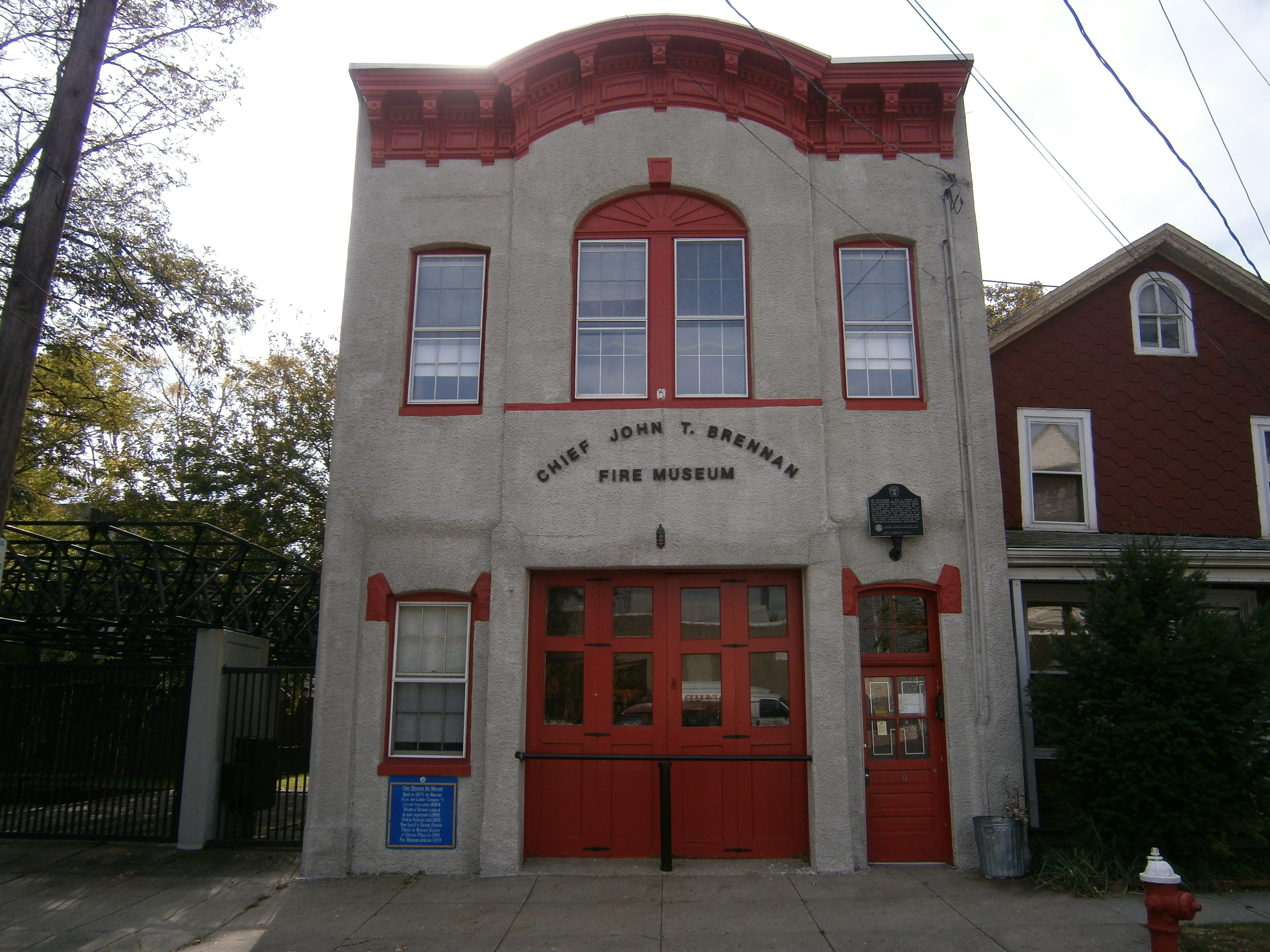

- Location within Hudson County, New Jersey Location within New Jersey Location within the United States
- Location: 10 West 47th Street, Bayonne, New Jersey
- Coordinates: 40°40′51″N 74°6′18″W
- Area: 0.1 acres (0.040 ha)
- Built: 1875
- Architectural style: Italianate
- NRHP reference No.: 76001155
- NJRHP No.: 1446

Significant dates
- Added to NRHP: January 2, 1976
- Designated NJRHP: January 2, 1976

Bayonne Truck House No. 1, also known as Chief John T. Brennan Fire Museum, is located in Bayonne, Hudson County, New Jersey, United States. The firehouse was added to the National Register of Historic Places on January 2, 1976. The firehouse was constructed in 1875 to be used by Bayonne Hook and Ladder Company #1. The firehouse is now a museum known as the John T. Brennan Fire Museum.

== See also ==
- National Register of Historic Places listings in Hudson County, New Jersey
- Exhibitions in Hudson County
