= Yeshiva Gedolah of Bayonne =

Coordinates: 40.67274°N 74.11413°W

Location
- 735 Avenue C Bayonne, New Jersey; Bayonne, New Jersey 07002; USA

Information
- Established: 1990
- Rosh Yeshiva: Rabbi Yakov Rokach
- Affiliation: Orthodox
- Bachurim: 60

Yeshiva Gedolah of Bayonne is an Orthodox Jewish yeshiva in Bayonne, New Jersey. Established in 1990, it includes high school, beis medrash, and kollel programs. The school caters to serious students, who dorm on-site. The languages of instruction are English and Yiddish.

== Faculty ==
- Rabbi Yakov Rokach, Rosh Yeshiva
- Rabbi Velvel Finkelstein, Nasi HaYeshiva
- Rabbi Mayer Birnbaum, Mashgiach
- Rabbi Yaakov Hamburger, tenth grade second seder Maggid Shiur. Author of several books & seforim, including Shaarei Rachamim, an anthology on the Thirteen Attributes of Mercy
- Rabbi Chananya Hess, Administrator

In March 2013 Rabbi Dovid Magid announced his resignation as rosh yeshiva, effective in 2014, and was succeeded by Rabbi Yaakov Rokach of Toronto.

Rabbi Mayer Birnbaum is noted for his authorship of the Pathway to Prayer series published by Feldheim and ArtScroll.

== Alumni ==
Several Talmudic scholars of note have emerged from the yeshiva. Among the most prominent is Yecheskel Sklar, author of Toras Haman Ha'agagi, a complex treatise regarding the acceptability of Amalekite conversion. Sklar is especially noted for breaking convention by engaging in pilpulic methodology, as opposed to the more common Brisker method.
