= Ronald Roberts (basketball) =

American-Dominican basketball player (born 1991)

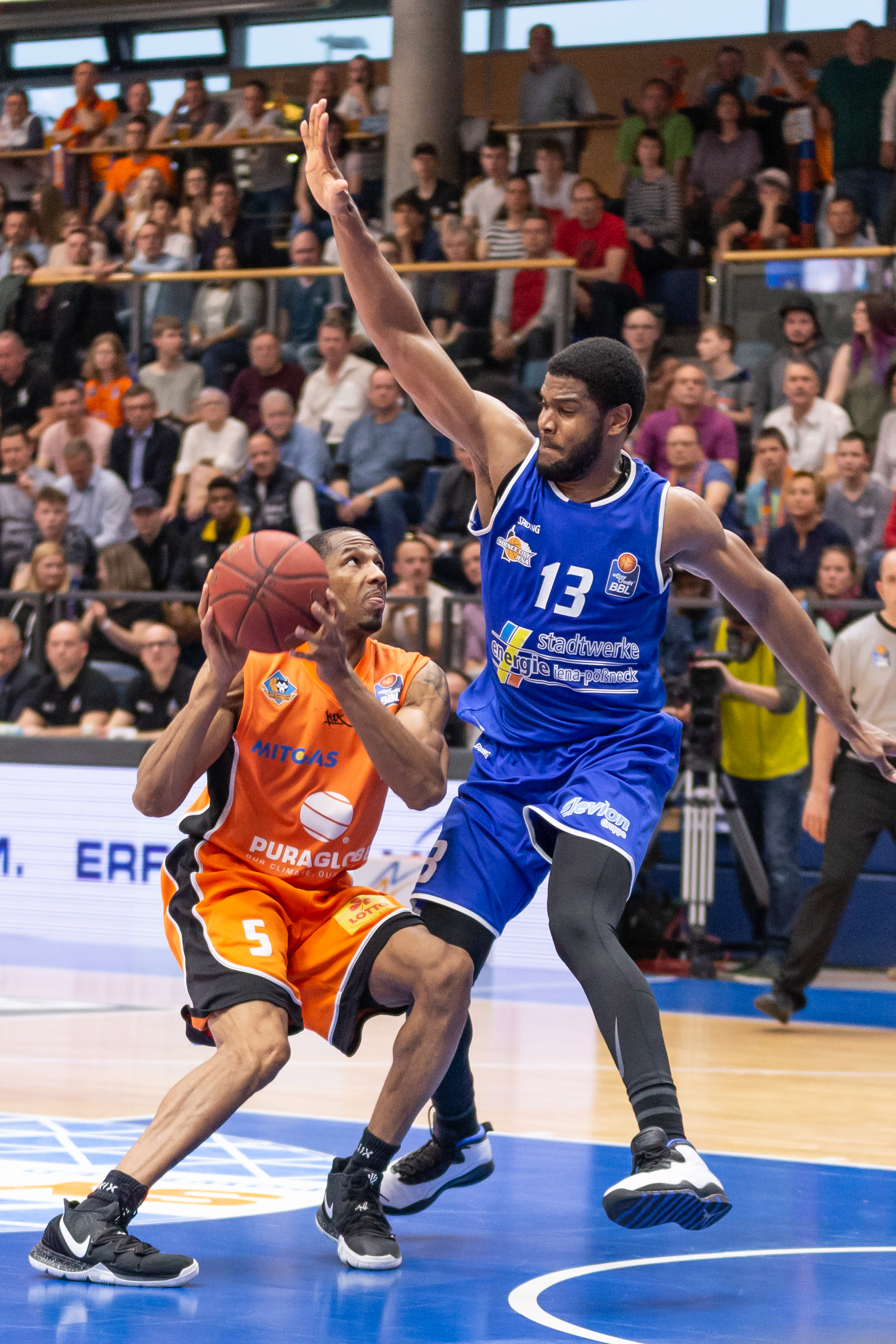
- Roberts (#13) with Science City Jena in April 2019

Personal information
- Born: August 5, 1991 (age 35) Bayonne, New Jersey, U.S.
- Listed height: 6 ft 8 in (2.03 m)
- Listed weight: 225 lb (102 kg)

Career information
- High school: Bayonne (Bayonne, New Jersey); St. Peter's Prep (Jersey City, New Jersey)
- College: Saint Joseph's (2010–2014)
- NBA draft: 2014: undrafted
- Playing career: 2014–2021
- Position: Power forward / center

Career history
- 2014–2015: Delaware 87ers
- 2015: Santa Cruz Warriors
- 2015: San Miguel Beermen
- 2015–2016: Raptors 905
- 2016: Tofaş
- 2017–2018: Hapoel Jerusalem
- 2019: Science City Jena
- 2019–2020: Élan Chalon
- 2021: Indios de San Francisco de Macorís

Career highlights
- NBA D-League All-Star (2016); 2× Third-team All-Atlantic 10 (2013, 2014); Atlantic 10 Sixth Man of the Year (2012)
- Stats at Basketball Reference

Ronald Christopher Roberts Jr. (born August 5, 1991) is an American-Dominican former professional basketball player. He played college basketball for Saint Joseph's University before playing professionally in the NBA Development League, the Philippines, Turkey, Israel, Germany, France, and the Dominican Republic. He represented the Dominican Republic national basketball team at the 2019 FIBA World Cup.

== High school career ==
In his freshman and sophomore years, Roberts attended Bayonne High School in his hometown of Bayonne, New Jersey, before transferring to St. Peter's Preparatory School in 2008 for his junior year. As a junior, he averaged 17.4 points, 11.0 rebounds and 3.0 blocks per game. He was selected as a first team all-county and all-league performer for a Marauders' squad that finished as county champions with a record of 23–3, ranking seventh in the state.

On November 19, 2009, Roberts signed a National Letter of Intent to play college basketball for St. John's University.

As a senior in 2009–10, Roberts averaged 19.0 points, 12.0 rebounds and 3.5 blocks per game, helping Saint Peter's to a 24–5 record and the number six ranking in the state.

=== Award/honors ===
- 2010 All-State Third Team
- 2010 All-Non Public Second Team
- 2010 Hudson County All-Area First Team
- 2009 Hudson County All-Area First Team

== College career ==
In April 2010, Roberts was released from his letter of intent with St. John's following a head coach change. The following month, he signed a Grant-in-Aid to play for Saint Joseph's University.

In his freshman season with the Saint Joseph's Hawks, Roberts was the recipient of the Robert O'Neill Memorial Award as the Hawks' Most Improved Player. In 33 games (12 starts), he averaged 6.4 points and 4.7 rebounds in 19.5 minutes per game.

In his sophomore season, he was the recipient of the Robert O'Neill Memorial Award for the second straight year. He was also named the Atlantic 10 Sixth Man of the Year. In 34 games, he averaged 10.9 points and 5.9 rebounds in 25.0 minutes per game.

In his junior season, he was the recipient of the Robert O'Neill Memorial Award for the third straight year. He was also the recipient of the John P. Hilferty Memorial Award as the Hawks' Most Valuable Player; was also named to the All-Atlantic 10 third team and the All-Big 5 first team. In 32 games (31 starts), he averaged 11.2 points, 8.3 rebounds and 1.0 assists in 30.7 minutes per game.

In his senior season, he was the recipient of the John P. Hilferty Memorial Award for the second straight year. He was also named to the All-Atlantic 10 third team for the second straight year. Following the Hawks' Atlantic 10 Tournament title, he was named to the 2014 Atlantic 10 All-Tournament team. In 32 games (all starts), he averaged 14.4 points, 7.4 rebounds, 1.3 assists and 1.3 blocks in 33.3 minutes per game.

== Professional career ==
=== 2014–15 season ===
After going undrafted in the 2014 NBA draft, Roberts joined the Philadelphia 76ers for the Orlando Summer League and the Miami Heat for the Las Vegas Summer League. In nine total summer league games, Roberts averaged 8.8 points and 5.8 rebounds per game. On September 29, 2014, he signed with the 76ers, only to be waived by the team on October 25 after appearing in four preseason games.

On November 3, 2014, Roberts was acquired by the Delaware 87ers of the NBA Development League as an affiliate player of the 76ers. On December 12, he re-signed with the 76ers, but just three days later was waived again by the team before playing in a game for them. He was subsequently reacquired by the 87ers on December 16. On January 21, 2015, he was traded to the Santa Cruz Warriors, along with the returning player rights to Darington Hobson, in exchange for Sean Kilpatrick and a 2015 first-round pick. After just two games for Santa Cruz, he left the team and signed with the San Miguel Beermen on January 27 as an import for the 2015 PBA Commissioner's Cup. In 16 D-League games in 2014–15 (14 for Delaware, 2 for Santa Cruz), he averaged 17.5 points, 11.9 rebounds, 1.6 assists and 1.1 blocks per game. On February 17, 2015, he was released by San Miguel after appearing in just four games.

=== 2015–16 season ===
On July 21, 2015, Roberts signed with the Toronto Raptors after averaging 10.3 points and 9.5 rebounds in four Summer League games for the team. On October 24, 2015, he was waived by the Raptors after appearing in three preseason games. On November 13, he was acquired by Raptors 905. He made his debut for Raptors 905 on November 25, recording 11 points and 13 rebounds as a starter in a 93–91 win over the Idaho Stampede. His 2015–16 season was marred by injuries. He missed the team's first five games due to an ankle sprain, missed a game on December 31 with a knee flare up, and was shelved in early February with a hip contusion. He was named a 2016 D-League All-Star, but played sparingly for the East team in the All-Star Game in part due to a jammed thumb. Having not played since an eight-minute stint on February 5, on March 16, he was ruled out for the rest of the season due to a right knee patellar tendon strain. He was subsequently waived by Raptors 905 on March 22. Roberts appeared in 24 games (all starts) for Raptors 905 in 2015–16, averaging 18.1 points, 12.1 rebounds, 1.3 assists and 1.5 blocks in 33.2 minutes per game.

=== 2016–17 season ===
In July 2016, Roberts joined the Milwaukee Bucks for the 2016 NBA Summer League. On July 4, 2016, he signed with Tofaş of the Turkish Basketball Super League. After suffering a knee injury in a game on December 10, 2016, Roberts parted ways with Tofaş and returned to the United States. In 10 games for Tofaş, he averaged 11.7 points, 6.2 rebounds and 1.3 assists per game.

=== 2017–18 season ===
On August 2, 2017, Roberts signed a one-year deal with the Adelaide 36ers of the National Basketball League. However, he was released from his contract on October 5, the season-opening day, due to a reported knee injury.

On November 13, 2017, Roberts signed with Israeli club Hapoel Jerusalem for the rest of the 2017–18 season. On December 16, 2017, Roberts made his Israeli League debut in an 88–86 win over Hapoel Holon, recording 14 points, 15 rebounds and four blocks. Roberts helped Jerusalem to reach the 2018 Israeli League Final Four, where they eventually lost to Hapoel Holon. In 32 games played during the 2017–18 season (both in the EuroCup and the Israeli League), Roberts averaged 10.4 points and 7 rebounds per game.

=== 2018–19 season ===
On January 25, 2019, Roberts signed with Science City Jena of the Basketball Bundesliga. In 15 games, he averaged 14.3 points and 6.3 rebounds per game.

=== 2019–20 season ===
On July 3, 2019, Roberts signed with French team Élan Chalon. In 22 games, he averaged 7.7 points and 4.1 rebounds per game.

=== 2021 ===
Between August 4 and September 1, 2021, Roberts played 11 games for Indios de San Francisco de Macorís of the Liga Nacional de Baloncesto. He averaged 8.8 points and 6.4 rebounds per game.

On December 27, 2021, Roberts announced his retirement from professional basketball.

== National team career ==
Roberts debuted for the Dominican Republic national team in 2014 at the Central American and Caribbean Basketball Championship. He helped the Dominican win bronze.

Roberts next played for the Dominican in the 2019 FIBA World Cup Qualifiers and later in the 2019 FIBA World Cup in China. His last appearance for the national team came during the 2022 FIBA AmeriCup Qualifiers.

== Personal life ==
Roberts' parents met in Portugal while both were playing professionally. Ronald Sr., who played at Oklahoma, quit after 10 years as a pro in Spain, Portugal, Brazil and the Dominican Republic to move his wife, Dania, their four sons and two daughters from her native Dominican to Bayonne, New Jersey. Dania works as an accountant while Ronald Sr. works as a hospital security guard.
