= Bayonne School District =

School district in Hudson County, New Jersey, US

Address
- 669 Avenue A Bayonne, Hudson County, New Jersey, 07002; United States
- Coordinates: 40.67176°N 74.121234°W

District information
- Grades: Pre-K to 12
- Superintendent: John J. Niesz
- Business administrator: Daniel Castles
- Schools: 13

Students and staff
- Enrollment: 10,276 (as of 2022–23)
- Faculty: 785.0 FTEs
- Student–teacher ratio: 13.2:1

Other information
- District Factor Group: CD
- Website: bboed.org
Ind.	Per pupil	District spending	Rank (*)	K-12 average	%± vs. average
1A	Total Spending	$15,344	5	$18,891	−18.8%
1	Budgetary Cost	11,998	8	14,783	−18.8%
2	Classroom Instruction	7,963	22	8,763	−9.1%
6	Support Services	1,348	2	2,392	−43.6%
8	Administrative Cost	1,066	4	1,485	−28.2%
10	Operations & Maintenance	1,441	29	1,783	−19.2%
13	Extracurricular Activities	136	10	268	−49.3%
16	Median Teacher Salary	51,955	2	64,043
Data from NJDoE 2014 Taxpayers' Guide to Education Spending. *Of K-12 districts with more than 3,500 students. Lowest spending=1; Highest=103

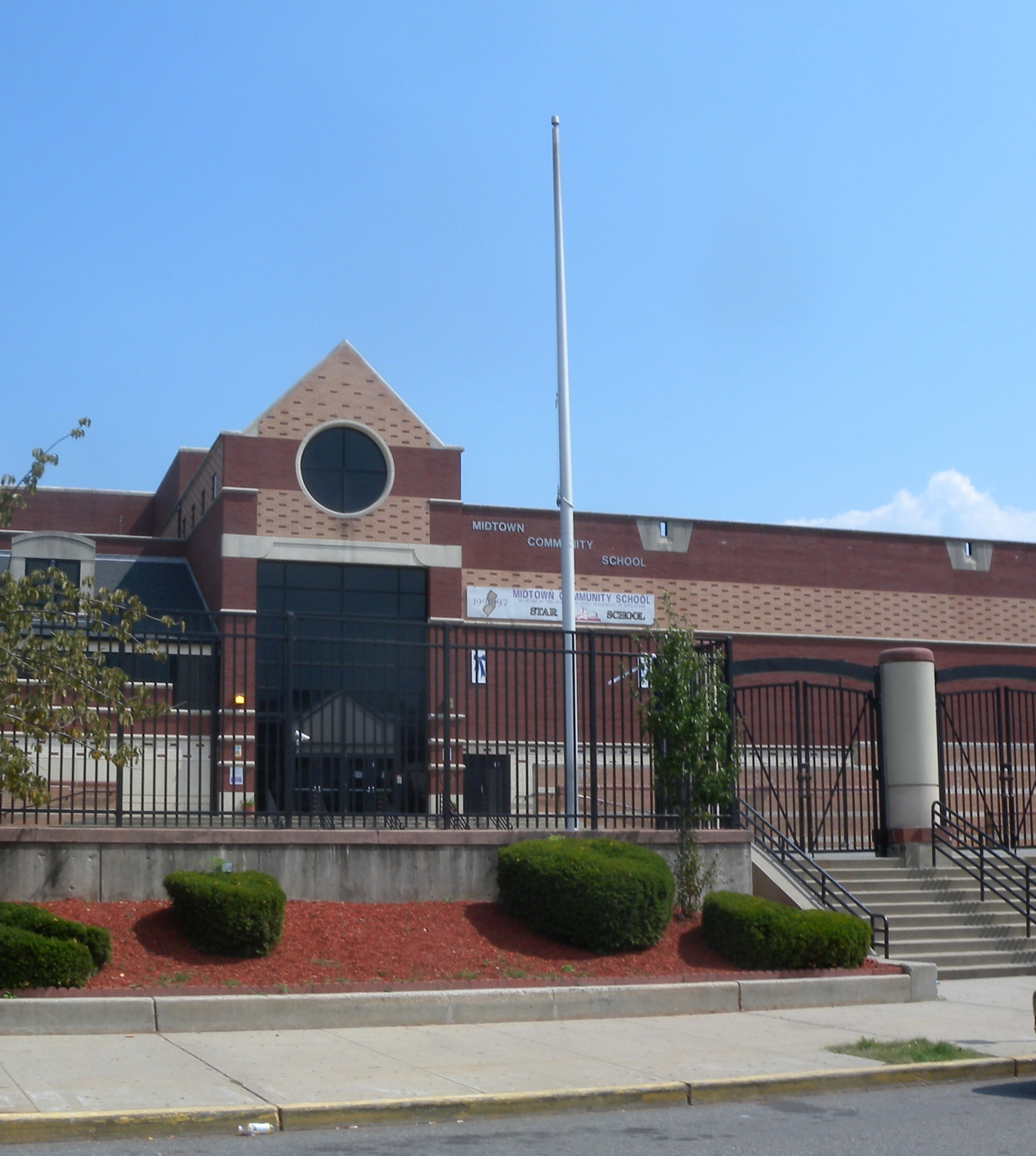
William Shemin Midtown Community School, PS 8

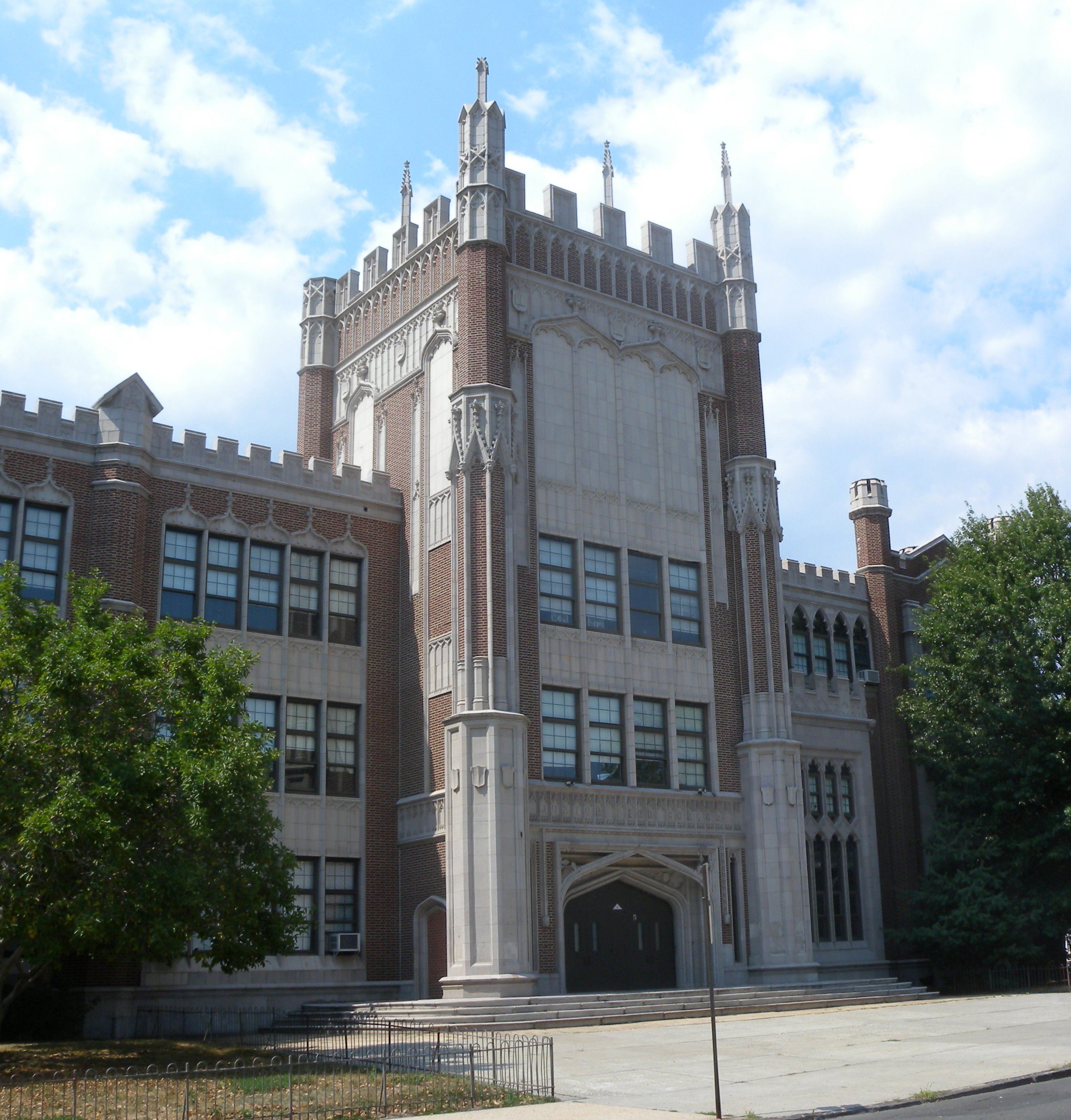
Bayonne High School

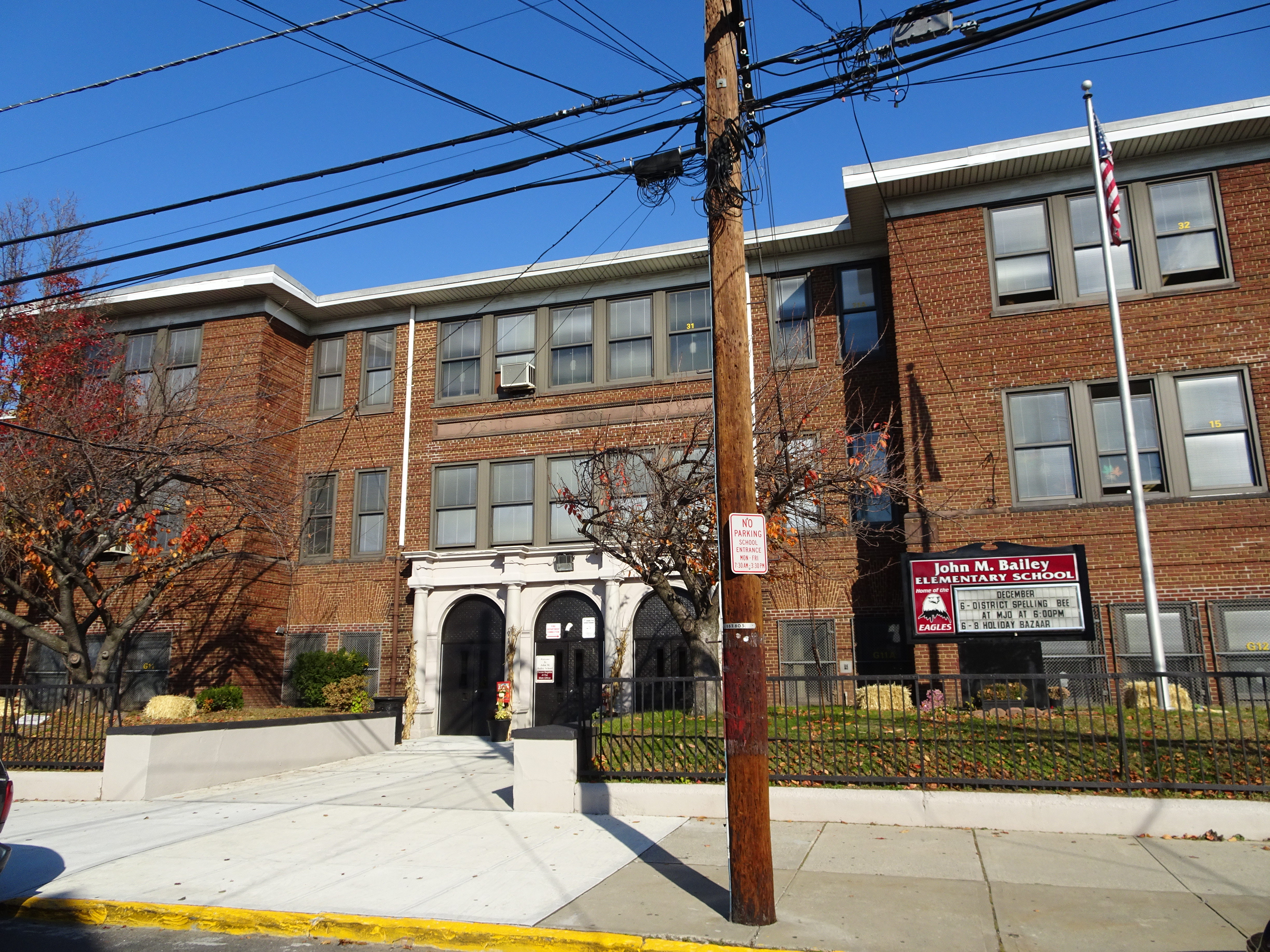
John M. Bailey School, PS 12

The Bayonne School District is a comprehensive public school district serving students from pre-kindergarten through twelfth grade from Bayonne in Hudson County, in the U.S. state of New Jersey.

As of the 2022–23 school year, the district, comprising 13 schools, had an enrollment of 10,276 students and 785.0 classroom teachers (on an FTE basis), for a student–teacher ratio of 13.2:1.

== Awards and recognition ==
Pursuant to the requirements of N.J.A.C. 6A:30, during the 2023–2024 school year, the Bayonne School District underwent the New Jersey Quality Single Accountability Continuum (NJQSAC) review. As a result of that review, the Bayonne School District was designated as a high performing district. This determination was made based on the five indicators which include Instruction and Program, Fiscal Management, Governance, Operations and Personnel.

In the 2021–2022 school year, Woodrow Wilson Community School received the National ESEA Distinguished School for its academic excellence, receiving an award from the U.S. Federal Government and the New Jersey Department of Education.

During the 2008–09 school year, Public School #14 Gifted & Talented was recognized with the National Blue Ribbon School Award of Excellence by the United States Department of Education, the highest award an American school can receive.

In 2009–2010, Washington Community School, Public School #9 was recognized with the National Blue Ribbon School Award of Excellence by the United States Department of Education, the highest award an American school can receive.

For the 2004–05 school year, Mary J. Donohoe No. 4 School was named a "Star School" by the New Jersey Department of Education, the highest honor that a New Jersey school can achieve. It is the fourth school in Bayonne to receive this honor. The other three are Bayonne High School in 1995–96, Midtown Community School in 1996-97 and P.S. #14 in the 1998–99 school year.

During the 2008–09 school year, Washington Community School was awarded the ASCA Honor Council Excellence Award, which is given to school's Student Councils who have met the requirements and completed projects in the areas of in leadership, citizenship, and community service.

== Schools ==
Schools in the district (with 2020–21 enrollment data from the National Center for Education Statistics) are:

Elementary schools

- John M. Bailey School No. 12 (648 students; in grades PreK-8)
  - Albert McCormick Jr., Principal
- Mary J. Donohoe No. 4 (454; PreK-8)
  - Philip J. Baccarella, Principal
- Henry E. Harris No. 1 (661; PreK-8)
  - Maria Kazimir, Principal
- Lincoln Community School No. 5 (489; PreK-8)
  - Carolyn Malanowski, Principal
- Horace Mann No. 6 (658; PreK-8)
  - Catherine Quinn, Ed.D., Principal
- Nicholas Oresko School No. 14 (388; PreK-8)
  - Monique Bullock, Principal
- Dr. Walter F. Robinson No. 3 (999; PreK-8). The facility was originally opened in 1910 as Bayonne High School, and was changed to an elementary school in the late 1930s when the present high school facility was completed. In 1977, it was renamed after a prominent history teacher who became school principal and assistant superintendent of schools and authored a history of the city of Bayonne.
  - Karen J. Fiermonte, Ed.D., Principal
- William Shemin Midtown Community School No. 8 (1,211; PreK-8). In November 2019, the school was renamed to honor World War I Medal of Honor hero, and Bayonne resident, William Shemin.
  - James Pondillo, Principal
- Philip G. Vroom No. 2 (454; PreK-8)
  - Stacey Janeczko, Principal
- George Washington Community School No. 9 (647; PreK-8)
  - George Becker, Principal
- Woodrow Wilson School No. 10 (734; PreK-8)
  - Tara Furmaniak, Principal

High School

- Bayonne High School (2,584; 9–12)
  - Keith Makowski, Principal
- Bayonne Alternative High School (141; 9–12)
  - Michael Pierson, Ed.D., Principal

== Dress code ==
The Bayonne Board of Education has implemented a dress code that took effect in the 2006–2007 school year for students in Pre-K through 8th grade. The plan was intended to "increase student identification with their schools and the district, Eliminate many of the distractions associated with differences in social or economic status, Allow the children, their teachers and the Board of Education to concentrate on shared pursuit of educational excellence and Instill a sense of belonging and school pride".

== Administration ==
Core members of the district's administration are:

- John J. Niesz, Superintendent
- Kenneth Kopacz, Deputy Superintendent
- Daniel Castles, Business Administrator, Board Secretary

== Board of education ==
The district's board of education is composed of nine members who set policy and oversee the fiscal and educational operation of the district through its administration. As a Type II school district, the board's trustees are elected directly by voters to serve three-year terms of office on a staggered basis, with three seats up for election each year held (since 2015) as part of the November general election. The board appoints a superintendent to oversee the district's day-to-day operations and a business administrator to supervise the business functions of the district.

In a November 2015 referendum, voters approved by a 3–1 margin a change from a Type I (appointed) to Type II (elected) school board.
