= Bayonne, New Jersey =

City in Hudson County, New Jersey, US

- City
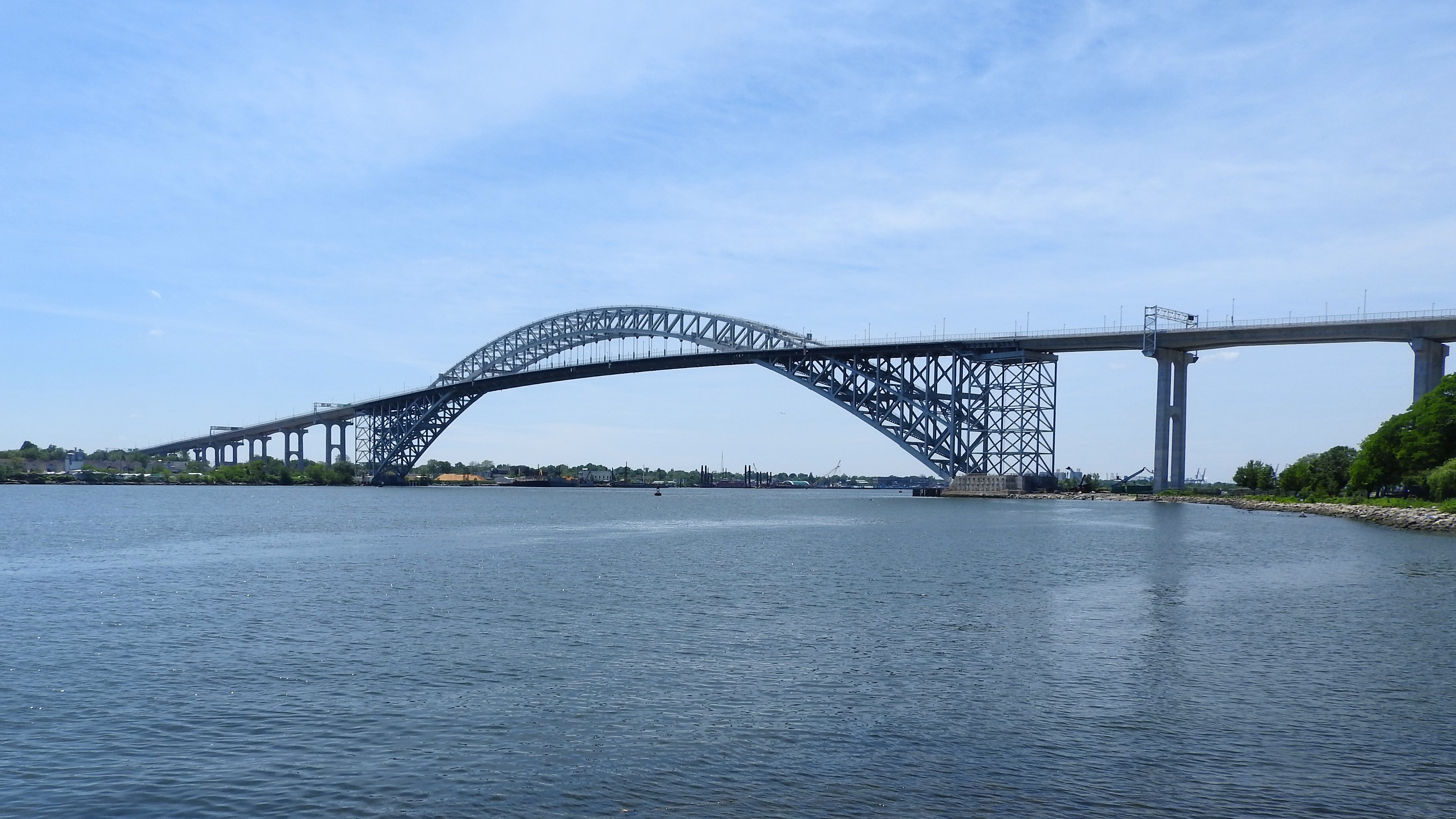
- The Bayonne Bridge in May 2019

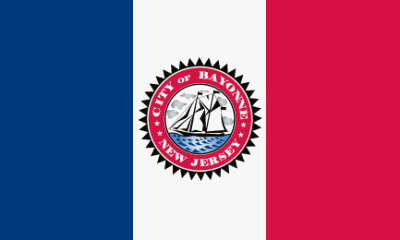
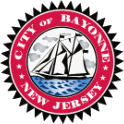
- Flag Seal Wordmark
- Interactive map of Bayonne, New Jersey
- Location in Hudson County Location in New Jersey Location in the United States
- Coordinates: 40.66253°N 74.110192°W
- Country: United States
- State: New Jersey
- County: Hudson
- Incorporated: April 1, 1861 (as township)
- Incorporated: March 10, 1869 (as city)
- Named for: Bayonne, France, or location on two bays

Government
  - Type: Faulkner Act Mayor-Council
  - Body: City Council
  - Mayor: Sharon Ashe-Nadrowski (term ends June 30, 2030)
  - Administrator: Mary Jane Desmond
  - Municipal clerk: Madelene C. Medina

Area
  - Total: 11.22 sq mi (29.06 km^{2})
  - Land: 5.82 sq mi (15.08 km^{2})
  - Water: 5.40 sq mi (13.98 km^{2}) 47.50%
  - Rank: 201st of 565 in state 2nd of 12 in county
- Elevation: 7 ft (2.1 m)

Population (2020)
  - Total: 71,686
  - Estimate (2024): 74,532
  - Rank: 541st in country (as of 2023); 15th of 565 in state 2nd of 12 in county
  - Density: 12,315.1/sq mi (4,754.9/km^{2})
  - Rank: 24th of 565 in state 10th of 12 in county
- Time zone: UTC−05:00 (Eastern (EST))
  - Summer (DST): UTC−04:00 (Eastern (EDT))
- ZIP Code: 07002
- Area codes: 201/551
- FIPS code: 3401703580
- GNIS feature ID: 0885151
- Website: www.bayonnenj.org

Bayonne (/beɪˈ(j)oʊn/ bay-(Y)OHN) is a city in Hudson County in the U.S. state of New Jersey, in the Gateway Region on Bergen Neck, a peninsula between Newark Bay to the west, the Kill Van Kull to the south, and New York Bay to the east. At the 2020 United States census, it was the state's 15th-most-populous municipality, surpassing Passaic, with a population of 71,686, an increase of 8,662 (+13.7%) from the 2010 census count of 63,024, which in turn reflected an increase of 1,182 (+1.9%) from the 61,842 counted in the 2000 census. The Census Bureau's Population Estimates Program calculated a population of 74,532 for 2024, making it the 517th-most populous municipality in the nation.

Bayonne was formed as a township in 1861, from portions of Bergen Township, and reincorporated as a city by an act of the New Jersey Legislature in 1869. At the time it was formed, Bayonne included the communities of Bergen Point, Constable Hook, Centreville, Pamrapo and Saltersville.

While somewhat diminished, traditional manufacturing, distribution, and maritime activities remain a driving force of the economy of the city. A portion of the Port of New York and New Jersey is located in the city at Port Jersey, as is the Cape Liberty Cruise Port.

== History ==
Originally inhabited by a collection of Native American tribes known as the Lenape, the region presently known as Bayonne was known as Lenapehoking. It was claimed by the Netherlands after Henry Hudson explored the North River, later named after him, on behalf of the Dutch East India Company in 1609. By 1621, the Dutch West India Company was organized to manage the new territory and in June 1623, New Netherland became a Dutch province, with headquarters across New York Harbor in New Amsterdam. In 1646, Director-General of New Netherland Willem Kieft, granted land to Jacob Jacobsen Roy, the chief gunner or constable at Fort Amsterdam. The land become known as "Constable Hook" (Konstapel's Hoeck in Dutch), after his title. Roy, however, never settled or farmed on the land. On January 10, 1658, Peter Stuyvesant, the new Director-General, "re-purchased" the scattered communities of farmsteads of Communipaw, Harsimus, Paulus Hook, Hoebuck, Awiehaken, Pamrapo, and other lands "behind Kill van Kull" from the Lenape. The village of Bergen (predecessor to Jersey City) was established in 1660 and officially chartered by Stuyvesant on September 5, 1661 as what would be the state's first local civil government. The charter partially removed Bergen from the jurisdiction of New Amsterdam and put the surrounding settlements under its authority. The Bayonne area, which included Pamrapo and Constable Hook, became known as "Bergen Neck".

On August 27, 1664, four English frigates sailed into New York Harbor and captured Fort Amsterdam, and by extension, all of New Netherland, a prelude to the Second Anglo-Dutch War, and renamed it New York. Later in 1664, the Duke of York (later James II), granted the land between the Hudson River and Delaware River to Sir George Carteret in recognition of his loyalty to the Crown through the English Civil War. Carteret named the land New Jersey after his homeland, the Channel Island of Jersey.

In 1776 ahead of the American Revolutionary War, General George Washington ordered American patriots to construct several forts to defend the western banks of the Hudson River and New York Harbor, one of which was Bergen Neck Fort near Pamrapo. It was constructed in July 1776 and later abandoned by patriot forces on October 5, 1776. It was taken over and occupied by Loyalists in 1777 who renamed it Fort Delancey in honor of prominent Loyalist Oliver De Lancey. The fort was occupied by Loyalists for most of the war until they abandoned and burned it in 1782. A historic sign marks the location of the fort at Avenue B between 51st and 52nd Streets.

In 1836, the Morris Canal was extended from Newark linking Bergen Neck with the interior of Northern New Jersey and the Delaware River. Steamboats linked the peninsula with New York City as early as 1846. The Central Railroad of New Jersey linked Bayonne to the west with the opening of the Newark Bay Railroad Bridge and to Manhattan via ferry with the opening of Communipaw Terminal at Jersey City in 1864.

On February 22, 1840, Bergen Neck became part of the newly created Hudson County which separated from Bergen County and annexed the former Essex County land of New Barbadoes Neck. In 1861, residents living between the Morris Canal and the Kill Van Kull organized to create Bayonne as a separate township from portions of Bergen Township, which was later reincorporated as a city by an act of the New Jersey Legislature on March 10, 1869. The creation of Bayonne united the villages of Bergen Point, Constable Hook, Centreville, Pamrapo and Saltersville. The city's first mayor was Henry Meigs, Jr. (1869–1879) who was also President of the New York Stock Exchange from 1877 to 1878.

According to Royden Page Whitcomb's 1904 book, First History of Bayonne, New Jersey, the name Bayonne is speculated to have originated with Bayonne, France, from which Huguenots settled for a year before the founding of New Amsterdam. However, there is no empirical evidence for this notion. Whitcomb gives more credence to the idea that Erastus Randall, E.C. Bramhall and B.F. Woolsey, who bought the land owned by Jasper and William Cadmus for real estate speculation, named it Bayonne for purposes of real estate speculation, because it was located on the shores of two bays, Newark and New York. Furthermore, "Bayonne Avenue", now 33rd Street, was a cross-town street that ran from Newark Bay to New York Bay and is officially recognized as the inspiration for city's name.

Soon after the Civil War, the idea arose of uniting all of the towns of Hudson County east of the Hackensack River into one municipality. In 1868, a bill for submitting the question of consolidation of all of Hudson County to the voters was presented to the Board of Chosen Freeholders (now known as the Board of County Commissioners). The bill was approved by the state legislature on April 2, 1869, with a special election to be held on October 5, 1869. An element of the bill provide that only contiguous towns could be consolidated. Bayonne voted to stay independent with 71.43% of residents voting against the bill. The Morris Canal became the northern most boundary or the "city line" separating Bayonne and what is now Jersey City.

In the mid-nineteenth century, wealthy New Yorkers and Americans, including presidents and authors, came to Bayonne to stay at its hotels and enjoy its brief status as an early beach resort. It was also an early boat building and yachting center where its fishers and oystermen supplied the regional market. As Bayonne began to urbanize and industrialize in the late nineteenth and early twentieth century, it became home to thousands of European immigrants landing at Ellis Island in New York Harbor. In 1888, Bayonne Medical Center opened in response to the city's growth.

Bayonne became one of the largest centers in the nation for refining crude oil and Standard Oil of New Jersey's facility—which had grown from its original establishment in 1877—and its 6,000 employees made it the city's largest employer. Significant civil unrest arose during the Bayonne refinery strikes of 1915–1916, in which mostly Polish-American workers staged labor actions against Standard Oil of New Jersey and the Tide Water Oil Company, seeking improved pay and working conditions. Four striking workers were killed when strikebreakers, allegedly protected by police, fired upon a violent crowd.

At the turn of the 20th century, the City Beautiful movement had spread throughout cities in the United States. Part of its mission was to preserve public space for recreational activities in urban industrial communities. The Hudson County Parks Commission was created in 1892 to plan and develop a county wide park and boulevard system similar to those found in other cities. From 1892 to 1897, Hudson Boulevard (now John F. Kennedy Boulevard) was built to connect the future park system from Bayonne through Jersey City to North Bergen. In 1916, Stephen R. Gregg—Bayonne Park opened on the Boulevard along the city's western shore line on Newark Bay. At 97.5 acres (39.5 ha), it is the largest park in Bayonne and was designed by Charles N. Lowrie, landscape architect for the Hudson County Parks Department. The park was named after Bayonne resident and World War II veteran Stephen R. Gregg in 1995. Named after Revolutionary War General Hugh Mercer, the 6.5 acres (2.6 ha) Mercer Park, was developed on the Boulevard from portions of Curries Woods on the border of Jersey City and Bayonne as a project of the Works Progress Administration in the 1930s.

In 1931, the Bayonne Bridge opened as the world's longest steel arch main span connecting Bayonne and Staten Island over the Kill Van Kull and was designed by bridge builder Othmar Ammann and architect Cass Gilbert. The bridge physically linked Bayonne to New York City for the first time. From 2013 to 2019, the bridge was rebuilt and its span elevated to accommodate the new Panamax ships for the widened Panama Canal.

In 1932, a plan was developed to build a 430-acre (170 ha) port terminal on Upper New York Bay. After the out break of World War II, the port was taken over by the United States government and became the Military Ocean Terminal at Bayonne (MOTBY). In 1942, the United States Navy opened the Bayonne Naval Drydock, the largest dry dock on the Eastern Seaboard, and the Bayonne Naval Supply Depot as a logistics and supply base. At the conclusion of the war, the MOTBY became port for the Atlantic Reserve Fleet, New York, also known as the Mothball Fleet, and later a Naval Inactive Ship Maintenance Facility (NISMF). In 1967, the peninsula became a United States Army base. The Military Sealift Command (MSC) used the base during the Persian Gulf War and during operations in Somalia and Haiti. The facility closed in 1999 under a 1995 directive from the Base Realignment and Closure commission. In 2004, Cape Liberty Cruise Port opened at the former MOTBY, now known as the Peninsula at Bayonne Harbor, with the Voyager of the Seas becoming the first passenger ship to depart from a New Jersey port in almost 40 years.

From 1996 to 2011, NJ Transit constructed the Hudson-Bergen Light Rail as one of the largest public works projects in state history. The system was built and extended through the city utilizing the former right-of-way and station locations of the Central Railroad of New Jersey. The system links Bayonne with Jersey City and its neighboring cities while connecting to several NJ Transit bus lines, PATH stations and ferry terminals.

In 2017, Jersey City Medical Center opened "RWJBarnabas Health at Bayonne" which hosts a 24/7 satellite emergency department (SED) and several outpatient departments and services.

== Geography and climate ==
=== Geography ===
An 1837 map of Bayonne, oriented with north pointing to the right

According to the United States Census Bureau, the city had a total area of 11.09 square miles (28.72 km^{2}), including 5.82 square miles (15.08 km^{2}) of land and 5.27 square miles (13.64 km^{2}) of water (47.50%).

The city is located on a peninsula that was earlier known as Bergen Neck. It is surrounded by Upper New York Bay to the east, Newark Bay to the west, and Kill Van Kull to the south. Bayonne is east of Newark, the state's largest city, north of Elizabeth in Union County and west of Brooklyn. It shares a land border with Jersey City to the north and is connected to Staten Island by the Bayonne Bridge.

Unincorporated communities, localities and place names located partially or completely within the city include: Bergen Point, Constable Hook and Port Johnson.

=== Climate ===
Bayonne has a humid subtropical climate (Cfa) bordering a hot-summer humid continental climate (Dfa). The average monthly temperature varies from 32.3 °F in January to 77.0 °F in July. The hardiness zone is 7b and the average absolute minimum temperature is 5.2 °F.

== Demographics ==
Historical population
Census	Pop.	Note	%±
1870	3,834		—
1880	9,372		144.4%
1890	19,033		103.1%
1900	32,722		71.9%
1910	55,545		69.7%
1920	76,754		38.2%
1930	88,979		15.9%
1940	79,198		−11.0%
1950	77,203		−2.5%
1960	74,215		−3.9%
1970	72,743		−2.0%
1980	65,047		−10.6%
1990	61,444		−5.5%
2000	61,842		0.6%
2010	63,024		1.9%
2020	71,686		13.7%
2024 (est.)	74,532		4.0%
Population sources: 1870–1920; 1870 1880–1890; 1890–1910 1870–1930; 1940–2000 2000; 2010 2020

The city has an ethnically diverse population, home to large populations of African Americans, Italian Americans, Irish Americans, Polish Americans, Indian Americans, Egyptian Americans, Dominican Americans, Puerto Ricans, Mexican Americans, Salvadoran Americans, Filipino Americans, and Pakistani Americans.

=== 2020 census ===
As of the 2020 census, Bayonne had a population of 71,686. The median age was 37.4 years. 22.1% of residents were under the age of 18 and 14.0% of residents were 65 years of age or older. For every 100 females there were 93.5 males, and for every 100 females age 18 and over there were 90.1 males age 18 and over.

There were 27,867 households in Bayonne, of which 31.9% had children under the age of 18 living in them. Of all households, 39.9% were married-couple households, 21.2% were households with a male householder and no spouse or partner present, and 32.5% were households with a female householder and no spouse or partner present. About 29.9% of all households were made up of individuals and 11.3% had someone living alone who was 65 years of age or older.

There were 29,727 housing units, of which 6.3% were vacant. The homeowner vacancy rate was 1.4% and the rental vacancy rate was 4.5%.

Racial composition as of the 2020 census
Race	Number	Percent
White	36,312	50.7%
Black or African American	8,011	11.2%
American Indian and Alaska Native	402	0.6%
Asian	7,122	9.9%
Native Hawaiian and Other Pacific Islander	30	0.0%
Some other race	11,100	15.5%
Two or more races	8,709	12.1%
Hispanic or Latino (of any race)	22,101	30.8%

=== 2010 census ===
The 2010 United States census counted 63,024 people, 25,237 households, and 16,051 families in the city. The population density was 10,858.3 per square mile (4,192.4/km^{2}). There were 27,799 housing units at an average density of 4,789.4 per square mile (1,849.2/km^{2}). The racial makeup was 69.21% (43,618) White, 8.86% (5,584) Black or African American, 0.31% (194) Native American, 7.71% (4,861) Asian, 0.03% (16) Pacific Islander, 10.00% (6,303) from other races, and 3.88% (2,448) from two or more races. Hispanic or Latino people of any race were 25.79% (16,251) of the population. Non-Hispanic Whites were 56.8% of the population.

Of the 25,237 households, 29.5% had children under the age of 18; 41.1% were married couples living together; 16.8% had a female householder with no husband present and 36.4% were non-families. Of all households, 31.6% were made up of individuals and 11.8% had someone living alone who was 65 years of age or older. The average household size was 2.49 and the average family size was 3.16.

22.5% of the population were under the age of 18, 8.9% from 18 to 24, 28.1% from 25 to 44, 27.3% from 45 to 64, and 13.2% who were 65 years of age or older. The median age was 38.4 years. For every 100 females, the population had 91.7 males. For every 100 females ages 18 and older there were 87.9 males.

The U.S. Census Bureau's 2006–2010 American Community Survey showed that (in 2010 inflation-adjusted dollars) median household income was $53,587 (with a margin of error of +/− $2,278) and the median family income was $66,077 (+/− $5,235). Males had a median income of $51,188 (+/− $1,888) versus $42,097 (+/− $1,820) for females. The per capita income for the city was $28,698 (+/− $1,102). About 9.9% of families and 12.3% of the population were below the poverty line, including 20.5% of those under age 18 and 8.4% of those age 65 or over.

=== 2000 census ===
As of the 2000 United States census there were 61,842 people, 25,545 households, and 16,016 families residing in the city. The population density was 10,992.2 inhabitants per square mile (4,244.1/km^{2}). There were 26,826 housing units at an average density of 4,768.2 per square mile (1,841.0/km^{2}). The racial makeup of the city was 78.8% White, 5.50% African American, 0.2% Native American, 4.1% Asian, 0.05% Pacific Islander, 7.46% from other races, and 4.02% from two or more races. Hispanic or Latino people of any race were 17.81% of the population.

As of the 2000 Census, the most common reported ancestries of Bayonne residents were Italian (20.1%), Irish (18.8%) and Polish (17.9%).

There were 25,545 households, out of which 28.3% had children under the age of 18 living with them, 42.8% were married couples living together, 15.1% had a female householder with no husband present, and 37.3% were non-families. 32.8% of all households were made up of individuals, and 15.0% had someone living alone who was 65 years of age or older. The average household size was 2.42 and the average family size was 3.10.

In the city the population was spread out, with 22.1% under the age of 18, 8.2% from 18 to 24, 30.7% from 25 to 44, 22.5% from 45 to 64, and 16.6% who were 65 years of age or older. The median age was 38 years. For every 100 females, there were 89.9 males. For every 100 females age 18 and over, there were 86.3 males.

The median income for a household in the city was $41,566, and the median income for a family was $52,413. Males had a median income of $39,790 versus $33,747 for females. The per capita income for the city was $21,553. About 8.4% of families and 10.1% of the population were below the poverty line, including 11.9% of those under age 18 and 11.0% of those age 65 or over.

== Economy ==
Bayonne has a rich industrial history, particularly in shipbuilding and manufacturing. The city is home to the former site of the Standard Oil Refinery.

Portions of the city are part of an Urban Enterprise Zone (UEZ), one of 32 zones covering 37 municipalities statewide. Bayonne was selected in 2002 as one of a group of three zones added to participate in the program. In addition to other benefits to encourage employment and investment within the Zone, shoppers can take advantage of a reduced 3.3125% sales tax rate (half of the 6 5/8% rate charged statewide) at eligible merchants. Established in September 2002, the city's Urban Enterprise Zone status expires in December 2023. More than 200 businesses have registered to participate in the city's UEZ since it was first established.

The Bayonne Town Center, located in the Broadway shopping district, includes retailers, eateries, consumer and small business banking centers. The Bayonne Medical Center is a for-profit hospital that anchors the northern end of the Town Center. It is the city's largest employer, with over 1,200 employees. A 2013 study showed that the hospital charged the highest rates in the United States.

Bayonne Crossing on Route 440 in Bayonne includes a Lowe's and Wal-Mart.

On the site of the former Military Ocean Terminal, the Peninsula at Bayonne Harbor includes new housing and businesses. One of them, Cape Liberty Cruise Port is located at the end of the long peninsula with Royal Caribbean. Also found is a memorial park for the Tear of Grief, a 100-foot-high (30 m), 175-short-ton (159 t) monument commemorating the September 11 terrorist attacks and the 1993 World Trade Center bombing.

The firearms manufacturing company Henry Repeating Arms moved from Brooklyn to Bayonne in 2009.

== Parks and recreation ==
Hackensack RiverWalk begins at Collins Park in Bergen Point where the Kill Van Kull meets the Newark Bay. Also along the bay is 16th Street Park. A plaque unveiled on May 2, 2006, for the new Richard A. Rutowski Park, a wetlands preserve on the northwestern end of town that is part of the RiverWalk. It is located immediately north of the Stephen R. Gregg Hudson County Park.

Hudson River Waterfront Walkway is part of a walkway that is intended to run the more than 18 miles (29 km) from the Bayonne Bridge to the George Washington Bridge.

In August 2014, the Bayonne Hometown Fair, a popular tourist and community attraction that ceased in 2000, was revived by a local business owner and resident. The first revived Bayonne Hometown Fair took place from June 6–7, 2015.

== Government ==
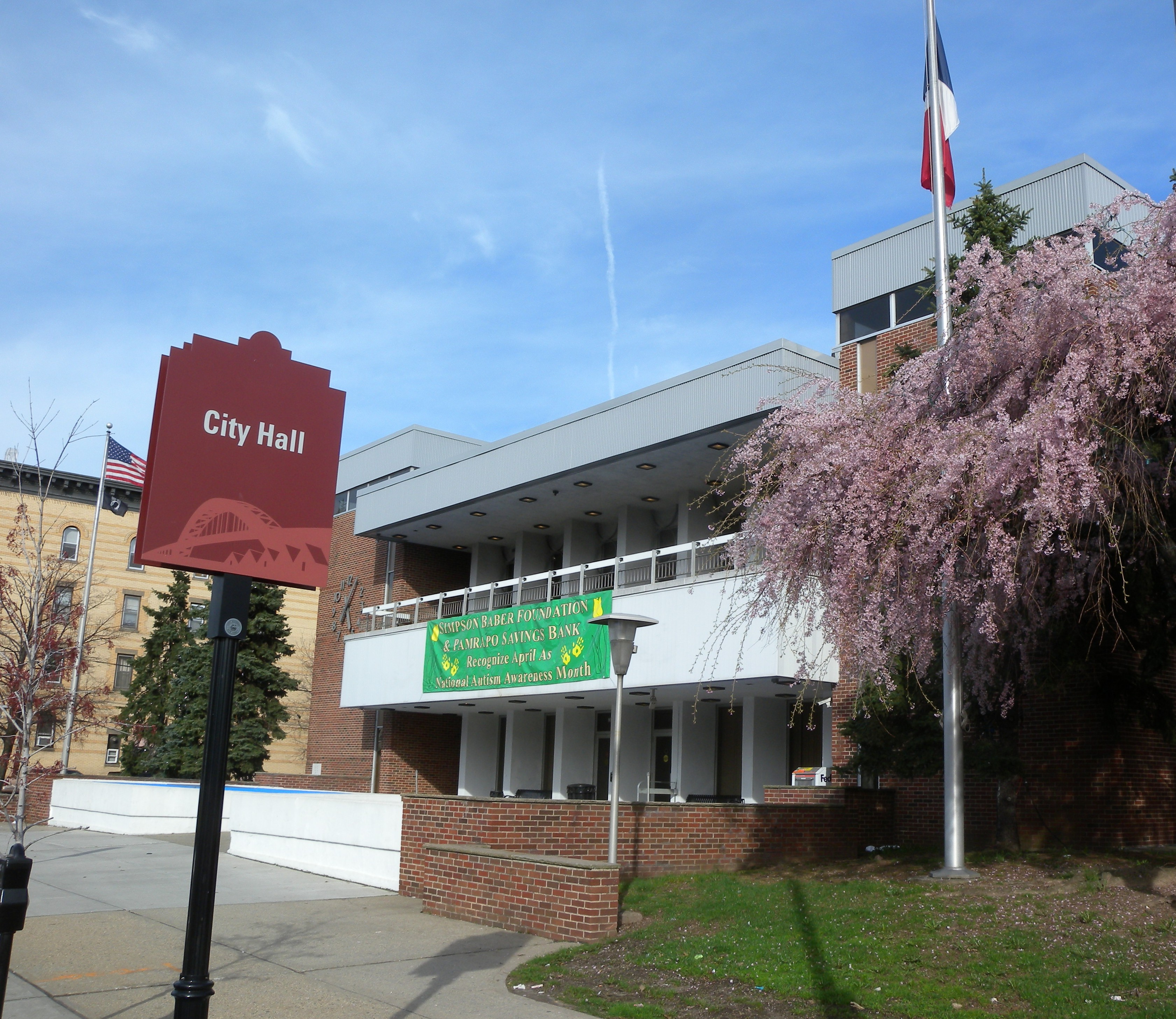
City Hall

=== Local government ===
The City of Bayonne has been governed within the Faulkner Act, formally known as the Optional Municipal Charter Law, under the Mayor-Council system of municipal government (Plan C), implemented based on the recommendations of a Charter Study Commission as of July 1, 1962, before which it was governed by a Board of Commissioners under the Walsh Act. The city is one of 71 municipalities (of the 564) statewide that use this form of government. The governing body is comprised of the mayor and the five-member City Council, of which two seats are chosen at-large and three from wards, all of whom serve four-year terms of office on a concurrent basis and are chosen in balloting held as part of the May municipal election.

As of 2026, the Mayor of Bayonne is Robert Kubert, who was appointed to serve the balance of the term of office ending June 30, 2026. Members of the Bayonne City Council are Council President Gary La Pelusa Sr. (3rd Ward), Loyad Booker (at-large), Neil Carroll III (1st Ward), Juan M. Perez (at-large) and Jacqueline Weimmer (2nd Ward), all of whom are serving concurrent terms of office that end on June 30, 2026.

Effective January 2026, Robert Kubert was appointed to be the city's interim mayor to fill the vacancy created after James M. "Jimmy" Davis stepped down to take office as Sheriff of Hudson County. Kubert would serve on an interim basis until June 30, 2026.

In November 2018, the City Council appointed Neil Carroll III to fill the 1st Ward seat vacated by Tommy Cotter, who resigned to take a position as the city's DPW director At age 27, Carroll became the youngest councilmember in city history. In the November 2019 general election, Carroll was elected to serve the balance of the term of office.

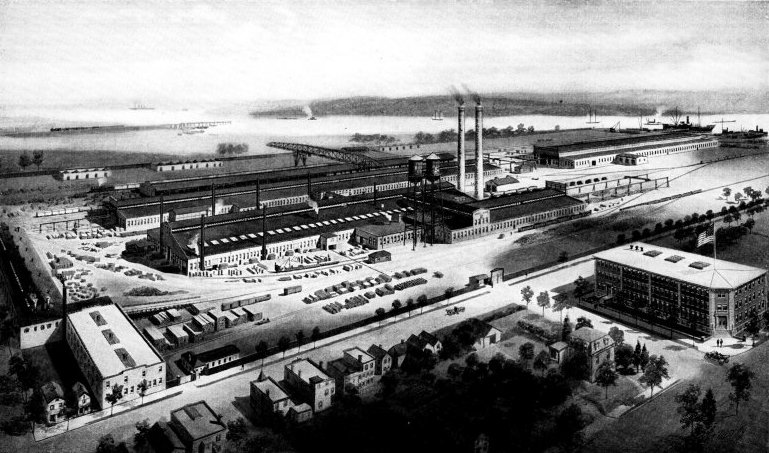
Babcock & Wilcox Co. works in 1919, one of the many industrial sites that were once located in Bayonne

=== Federal, state, and county representation ===
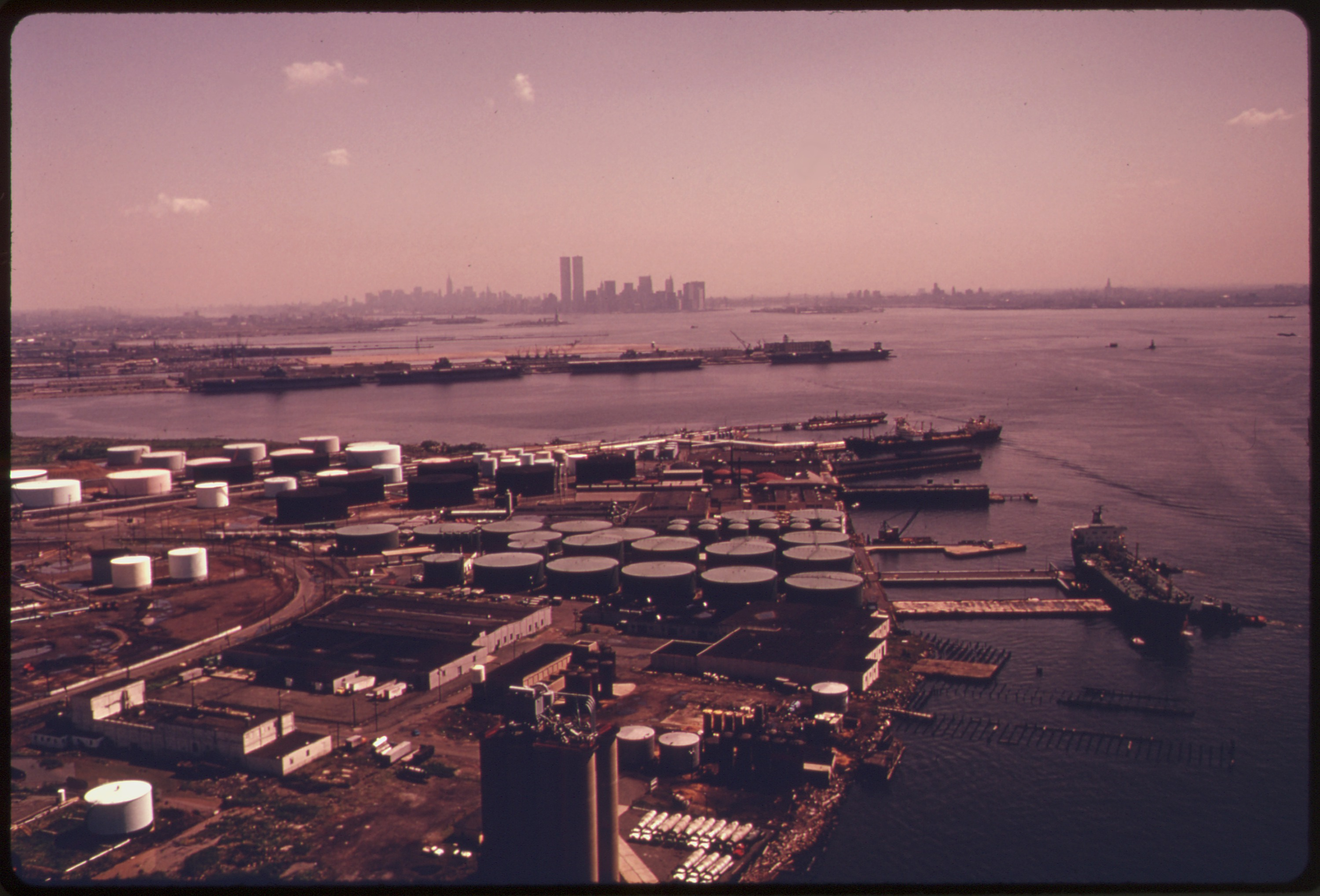
View of Manhattan from Bayonne, 1974

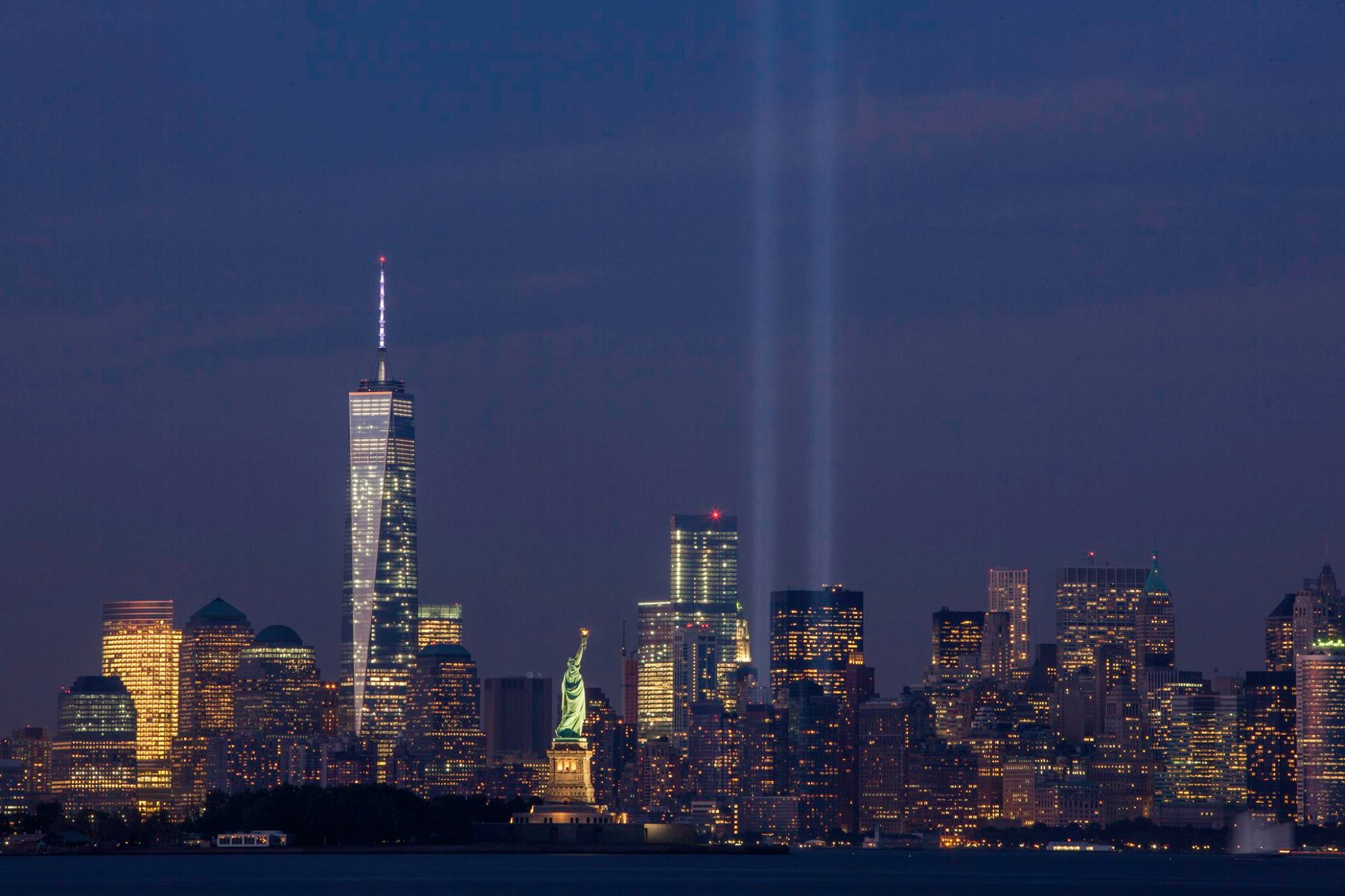
View of Lower Manhattan from Bayonne, September 11, 2014

Bayonne is in the 8th Congressional District and is part of New Jersey's 31st state legislative district.

Prior to the 2010 Census, Bayonne had been split between the 10th Congressional District and the 13th Congressional District, a change made by the New Jersey Redistricting Commission that took effect in January 2013, based on the results of the November 2012 general elections. The split placed 33,218 residents living in the city's south and west in the 8th District, while 29,806 residents in the northeastern portion of the city were placed in the 10th District.

For the 119th United States Congress, New Jersey's 8th congressional district is represented by Rob Menendez (D, Jersey City). New Jersey is represented in the United States Senate by Democrats Cory Booker (Newark, term ends 2027) and Andy Kim (Moorestown, term ends 2031). For the 2026–2027 session, the 31st legislative district of the New Jersey Legislature is represented in the State Senate by Angela V. McKnight (D, Jersey City) and in the General Assembly by William Sampson (D, Bayonne) and Jerry Walker (D, Jersey City).

Hudson County is governed by the directly elected Hudson County Executive and by a Board of County Commissioners, which serves as the county's legislative body. As of 2025, Hudson County's Hudson County Executive is Craig Guy (D, Jersey City), whose term of office expires December 31, 2027. Hudson County's Commissioners are Kenneth Kopacz (D, District 1 - Bayonne and parts of Jersey City; 2026, Bayonne), William O'Dea (D, District 2 - Western Jersey City; 2026, Jersey City), Vice Chair Jerry Walker (D, District 3 - South Eastern Jersey City Yraida Aponte-Lipski (D, District 4 - North Eastern Jersey City; 2026, Jersey City), Chair Anthony L. Romano Jr. (D, District 5 - Hoboken and parts of Jersey City; 2026, Hoboken), Fanny J. Cedeño (D, District 6 - Union City; 2026, Union City), Caridad Rodriguez (D, District 7 - Weehawken, West New York, and Gutenberg; 2026, West New York), Robert Bascelice (D, District 8 - West New York, North Bergen, Secaucus; 2026, North Bergen) and Albert J. Cifelli (D, District 9 - Secaucus, Kearny, East Newark, Harrison; 2026, Harrison)

Hudson County's constitutional officers are County Clerk E. Junior Maldonado (D, Jersey City, 2027), Register Jeffrey Dublin (D, Jersey City, 2026) Sheriff Frank X. Schillari (R, Jersey City, 2025) and Surrogate Tilo E. Rivas (D, Jersey City, 2029)

=== Politics ===
As of March 2011, there were a total of 32,747 registered voters in Bayonne, of which 17,087 (52.2%) were registered as Democrats, 2,709 (8.3%) were registered as Republicans and 12,928 (39.5%) were registered as Unaffiliated. There were 23 voters registered to other parties.

Gubernatorial election results for Bayonne
Year	Republican		Democratic		Third party(ies)	
Year	No.	%	No.	%	No.	%
2025	6,434	37.46%	10,515	61.23%	225	1.31%
2021	5,702	44.39%	7,135	55.55%	08	0.06%
2017	3,395	32.08%	6,948	65.65%	240	2.27%
2013	5,322	49.33%	5,297	49.10%	169	1.57%
2009	5,333	39.22%	7,421	54.57%	845	6.21%
2005	4,357	31.67%	9,052	65.80%	348	2.53%

In the 2012 presidential election, Democrat Barack Obama received 66.4% of the vote (13,467 cast), ahead of Republican Mitt Romney with 32.6% (6,605 votes), and other candidates with 1.0% (197 votes), among the 20,454 ballots cast by the city's 34,424 registered voters (185 ballots were spoiled), for a turnout of 59.4%. In the 2008 presidential election, Democrat Barack Obama received 57.0% of the vote here (13,768 cast), ahead of Republican John McCain with 40.6% (9,796 votes) and other candidates with 1.2% (283 votes), among the 24,139 ballots cast by the town's 35,823 registered voters, for a turnout of 67.4%. In the 2004 presidential election, Democrat John Kerry received 56.0% of the vote here (12,402 ballots cast), outpolling Republican George W. Bush with 42.2% (9,341 votes) and other candidates with 0.6% (184 votes), among the 22,135 ballots cast by the town's 32,129 registered voters, for a turnout percentage of 68.9.

Presidential Elections Results
Year	Republican	Democratic	Third Parties
2024	46.3% 11,847	50.2% 12,837	3.5% 772
2020	38.8% 10,869	58.2% 16,306	3.0% 294
2016	39.7% 8,636	57.2% 12,437	2.7% 590
2012	32.6% 6,605	66.4% 13,467	1.0% 197
2008	40.6% 9,796	57.0% 13,768	1.2% 283
2004	42.2% 9,341	56.0% 12,402	0.6% 184

In the 2013 gubernatorial election, Republican Chris Christie received 49.3% of the vote (5,322 cast), ahead of Democrat Barbara Buono with 49.1% (5,297 votes), and other candidates with 1.6% (169 votes), among the 10,987 ballots cast by the city's 34,957 registered voters (199 ballots were spoiled), for a turnout of 31.4%. In the 2009 gubernatorial election, Democrat Jon Corzine received 53.8% of the vote here (7,421 ballots cast), ahead of Republican Chris Christie with 38.7% (5,333 votes), Independent Chris Daggett with 4.8% (662 votes) and other candidates with 1.3% (183 votes), among the 13,781 ballots cast by the town's 32,588 registered voters, yielding a 42.3% turnout.

United States Senate election results for Bayonne1
Year	Republican		Democratic		Third party(ies)	
Year	No.	%	No.	%	No.	%
2024	9,167	41.26%	11,929	53.69%	1,124	5.06%
2018	5,703	34.22%	10,493	62.96%	471	2.83%
2012	5,067	27.84%	12,735	69.96%	401	2.20%
2006	4,509	34.01%	8,545	64.45%	204	1.54%

United States Senate election results for Bayonne2
Year	Republican		Democratic		Third party(ies)	
Year	No.	%	No.	%	No.	%
2020	8,999	34.57%	16,211	62.27%	825	3.17%
2014	2,776	29.14%	6,505	68.29%	245	2.57%
2013	2,452	37.62%	3,975	60.99%	90	1.38%
2008	5,997	33.64%	11,095	62.23%	736	4.13%

== Local services ==
=== Municipal Utilities Authority ===
The Bayonne Municipal Utilities Authority (BMUA) is the second agency to use wind power in New Jersey and has built the first wind turbine in the metropolitan area. Construction of a single turbine tower was completed in January 2012. It is the first wind turbine created by Leitwind to be installed in the United States.

In December 2012, the autonomous agency entered into a water management agreement with the Bayonne Water Joint Venture (BWJV), a partnership between United Water and investment firm KKR. The 40-year concession agreement is a public-private partnership between the city and the BWJV in which the private partners pay off the BMUA's $130 million debt and take over the operations, maintenance, and capital improvement of Bayonne's water and wastewater utilities in exchange for a regulated share of the revenue. United Water is managing the operations for the partnership, while KKR is providing 90% of the funding. A rate schedule was included in the agreement, and it contained an immediate 8.5% utility rate increase (the first rate increase since 2006), followed by two years without increases, followed by annual increases estimated to range between 2.5%–4.5%. This partnership was sought for several reasons, including the BMUA's debt, its shortage of skilled employees, and its lagging rate revenue from years without rate increases and reduced demand. Part of this reduced demand stemmed from the closure of the Military Ocean Terminal at Bayonne, and the fact that the subsequent plans to redevelop the site with housing fell short. The BMUA's $130 million debt that was paid off by the BWJV represented over half of Bayonne's overall debt ($240 million) at the time, and in March 2013, Moody's Investors Service upgraded the credit rating of Bayonne from 'negative' to 'stable', citing the water deal.

=== Fire department ===
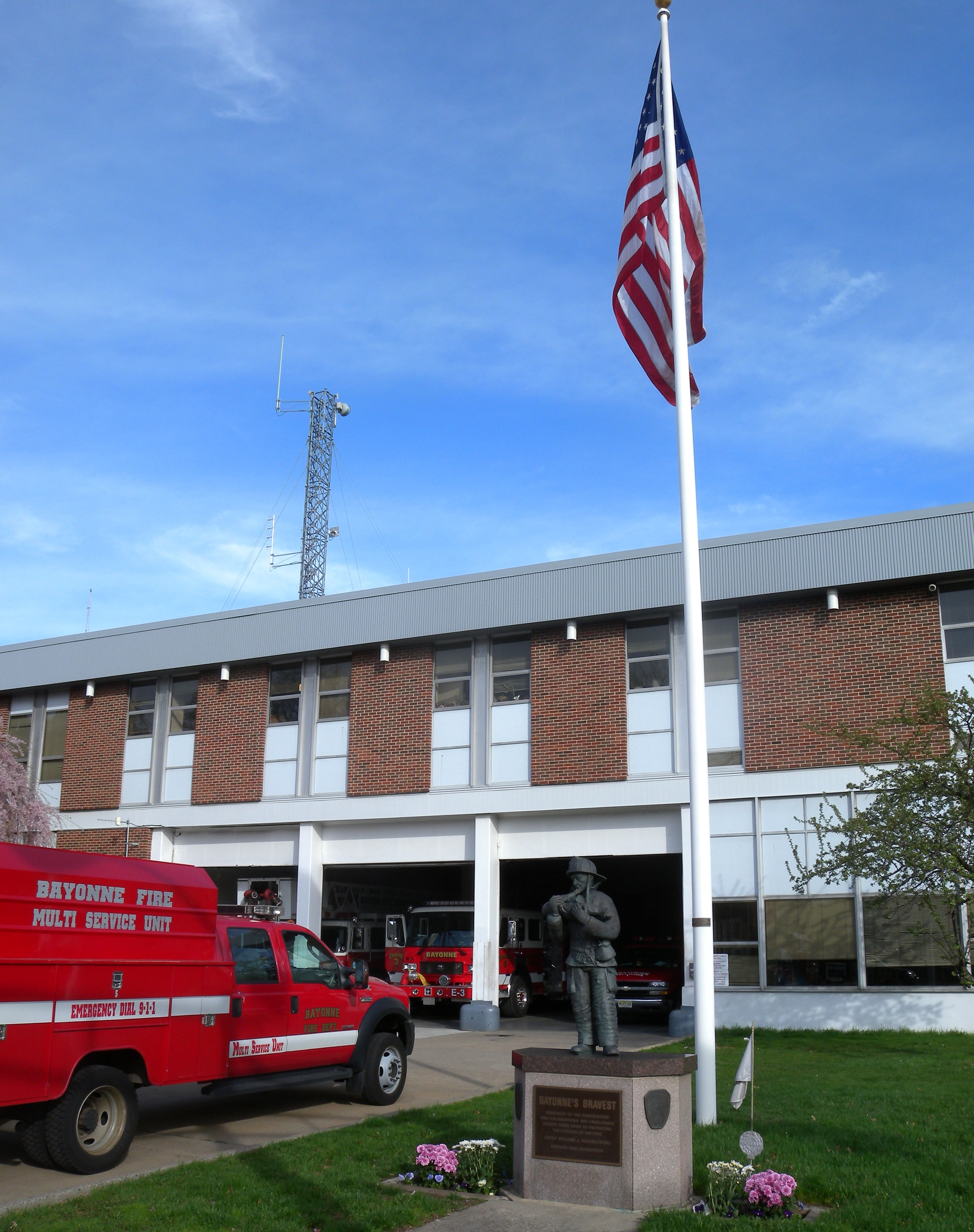
Fire Station # 3

The city of Bayonne has around 180 full-time professional firefighters consisting of the city of Bayonne Fire Department (BFD), which was founded on September 3, 1906, and operates out of five fire stations located throughout the city. The Bayonne Fire Dept operates a fleet of five engines, one squad (rescue-pumper), three ladder trucks, a heavy rescue truck (which is also part of the Metro USAR Collapse Rescue Strike Team), a 4,000-US-gallon (15,000 L; 3,300 imp gal) foam tanker truck, a haz-mat truck, a multi-service unit, a fireboat, as well as spare apparatus. Each tour is commanded by a battalion chief.

The department is part of the Metro USAR Strike Team, which consists of nine North Jersey fire departments and other emergency services divisions working to address major emergency rescue situations.

=== Office of Emergency Management ===
The Office of Emergency Management (OEM) is charged with mitigation, preparedness, response, and recovery for all disasters and emergencies within the city. Bayonne OEM coordinates emergency response of multiple agencies (Police, Fire, EMS, DPW). Bayonne OEM falls under Hudson County OEM and New Jersey State Police OEM, and is an EMAA certified city under the NJ State Police. Bayonne OEM has an active social media presence and utilizes a Text-Alert and Robocall system (Bay911 Emergency Notification System) to keep the community aware of major incidents and weather related alerts. Bayonne OEM is staffed by one civilian coordinator.

== Education ==
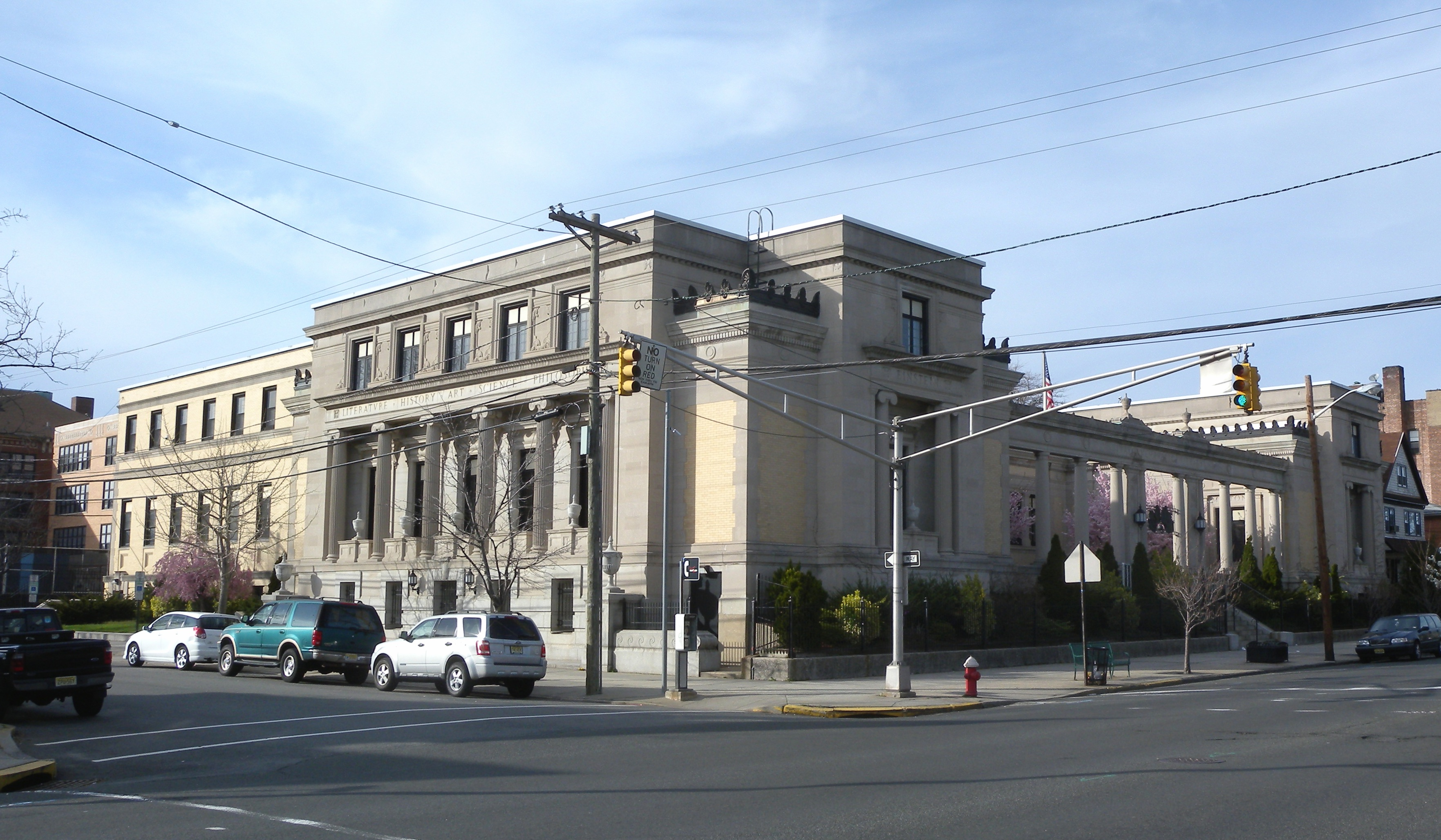
Bayonne Free Public Library and Cultural Center

=== Public schools ===
The Bayonne School District serves students from pre-kindergarten through twelfth grade. As of the 2020–21 school year, the district, comprised of 13 schools, had an enrollment of 10,059 students and 763.0 classroom teachers (on an FTE basis), for a student–teacher ratio of 13.2:1. Schools in the district (with 2020–21 enrollment data from the National Center for Education Statistics) are John M. Bailey School No. 12 (656 students; in grades PreK-8), Mary J. Donohoe No. 4 (459; PreK-8), Henry E. Harris No. 1 (637; PreK-8), Lincoln Community School No. 5 (433; PreK-8), Horace Mann No. 6 (641; PreK-8), Nicholas Oresko School No. 14 (444; PreK-8), Dr. Walter F. Robinson No. 3 (772; PreK-8), William Shemin Midtown Community School No. 8 (1,230; PreK-8), Phillip G. Vroom No. 2 (485; PreK-8), George Washington Community School No. 9 (677; PreK-8), Woodrow Wilson School No. 10 (747; PreK-8), Bayonne High School (1,290; 9-12) and Bayonne Alternative High School (141; 9-12). Bayonne High School is the only public school in the state to have an on-campus ice rink for its hockey team.

During the 1998–99 school year, Midtown Community School No. 8 was recognized with the National Blue Ribbon School Award of Excellence by the United States Department of Education. During the 2008–2009 school year, Nicholas Oresko School No. 14 was recognized as a Blue Ribbon School award, and Washington Community School No. 9 was honored during the 2009–2010 school year.

For the 2004–05 school year, Mary J. Donohoe No. 4 School was named a "Star School" by the New Jersey Department of Education, the highest honor that a New Jersey school can achieve. It is the fourth school in Bayonne to receive this honor. The other three are Bayonne High School in 1995–96, Midtown Community School in 1996–97 and P.S. #14 in the 1998–99 school year.

=== Private schools ===
Private schools in Bayonne include All Saints Catholic Academy, for grades Pre-K–8, which operates under the supervision of the Roman Catholic Archdiocese of Newark and was one of eight private schools recognized in 2017 as an Exemplary High Performing School by the National Blue Ribbon Schools Program of the United States Department of Education. Marist High School, a co-ed Catholic high school, announced in January 2020 that it would close at the end of the 2019–2020 school year due to deficits that had risen to $1 million and enrollment that had declined by 50% since 2008.

The Yeshiva Gedolah of Bayonne is a yeshiva high school / beis medrash / Kolel with 130 students.

Holy Family Academy for girls in ninth through twelfth grades was closed at the end of the 2012–2013 school year in the wake of financial difficulties and declining enrollment, having lost the support of the Sisters of St. Joseph of Chestnut Hill, Philadelphia in 2008.

=== Libraries and museums ===
The Bayonne Public Library, one of New Jersey's original 36 Carnegie libraries, the Bayonne Community Museum, the Bayonne Firefighters Museum, and the Joyce-Herbert VFW Post 226 Veterans Museum provide educational events and programs.

== Media and culture ==
Bayonne is located within the New York media market, with most of its daily papers available for sale or delivery. Local, county, and regional news is covered by the daily Jersey Journal. The Bayonne Community News is part of The Hudson Reporter group of local weeklies. Other weeklies, the River View Observer and El Especialito also cover local news. Bayonne-based periodicals include the Bayonne Evening Star-Telegram (B.E.S.T.).

Bayonne's local culture is served by the Annual Outdoor Art Show, which was instituted in 2008, in which local artists display their works.

In the 1983 novel Winter's Tale by Mark Helprin, which is set in a fantastical version of New York City and its surroundings, "The Bayonne Marsh" is the hidden, inaccessible home of the Marshmen, a race of fierce warriors.

Jackie Gleason, a former headliner at the Hi-Hat Club in Bayonne, was fascinated by the city and mentioned it often in the television series The Honeymooners.

Films set in Bayonne include the 1991 film Mortal Thoughts, with Demi Moore and Bruce Willis, which was filmed near Horace Mann School and locations around Bayonne and Hoboken; the 2000 drama Men of Honor, starring Robert De Niro and Cuba Gooding Jr.; the 2002 drama Hysterical Blindness; and the 2005 Tom Cruise science fiction film War of the Worlds, which opens at the Bayonne home of the lead character, and depicts the destruction of the Bayonne Bridge by aliens. Films shot in Bayonne include the 2001 film A Beautiful Mind, scenes of which were filmed at the Peninsula at Bayonne Harbor, and the 2008 Mickey Rourke drama The Wrestler, which was partially filmed in the Color & Cuts Salon and the former Dolphin Gym, both of which are on Broadway in Bayonne.

The November 16, 2010, episode of The Daily Show with Jon Stewart parodied former Alaska Governor Sarah Palin's reality television series, Sarah Palin's Alaska, in the form of a trailer for a fictional reality show called Jason Jones' Bayonne, New Jersey, whose portrayal of the city was characterized by prostitution, drugs, crime, pollution and a stereotypical Italian-American population. Bayonne Mayor Mark Smith criticized the sketch, saying, "Jon Stewart's unfortunate and inaccurate depiction of Bayonne represents a lame attempt at humor at the expense of a rock solid, all-American community." It is also referenced in the humorous song "The Rolling Mills of New Jersey" by John Roberts and Tony Barrand as the narrator's home town.

The comic strip Piranha Club (originally "Ernie"), drawn by Bud Grace, is set in and around Bayonne.

=== Religion ===
The Roman Catholic Archdiocese of Newark operates Catholic churches. Two in Bayonne, Blessed Miriam Teresa Demjanovich Church and St. John Paul II Church, were formed from consolidations, in 2016, because the number of people attending Catholic churches declined.

Demjanovich church is a merger of St. Andrew and St. Mary Star of the Sea churches, with the merged congregation keeping the two sites for worship. Reverend Alexander Santora in the Jersey Journal wrote that due to the efforts of the pastor, the Demjanovich merger "went off, however, without a hitch."

Three other churches, Our Lady of the Assumption, Our Lady of Mt. Carmel, and St. Michael/St. Joseph, merged into John Paul II in 2016. There were unsuccessful protests to keep Assumption open, and the archdiocese committed to closing that church.

Bayonne's Jewish community is served by Temple Beth Am (Reform), Temple Emanu-El (Conservative), Ohav Zedek (Orthodox), and Chabad (Orthodox). Rabbi Reuven Frank served as the city's chief rabbi from 1929 to 1931.

== Transportation ==
=== Roads and highways ===
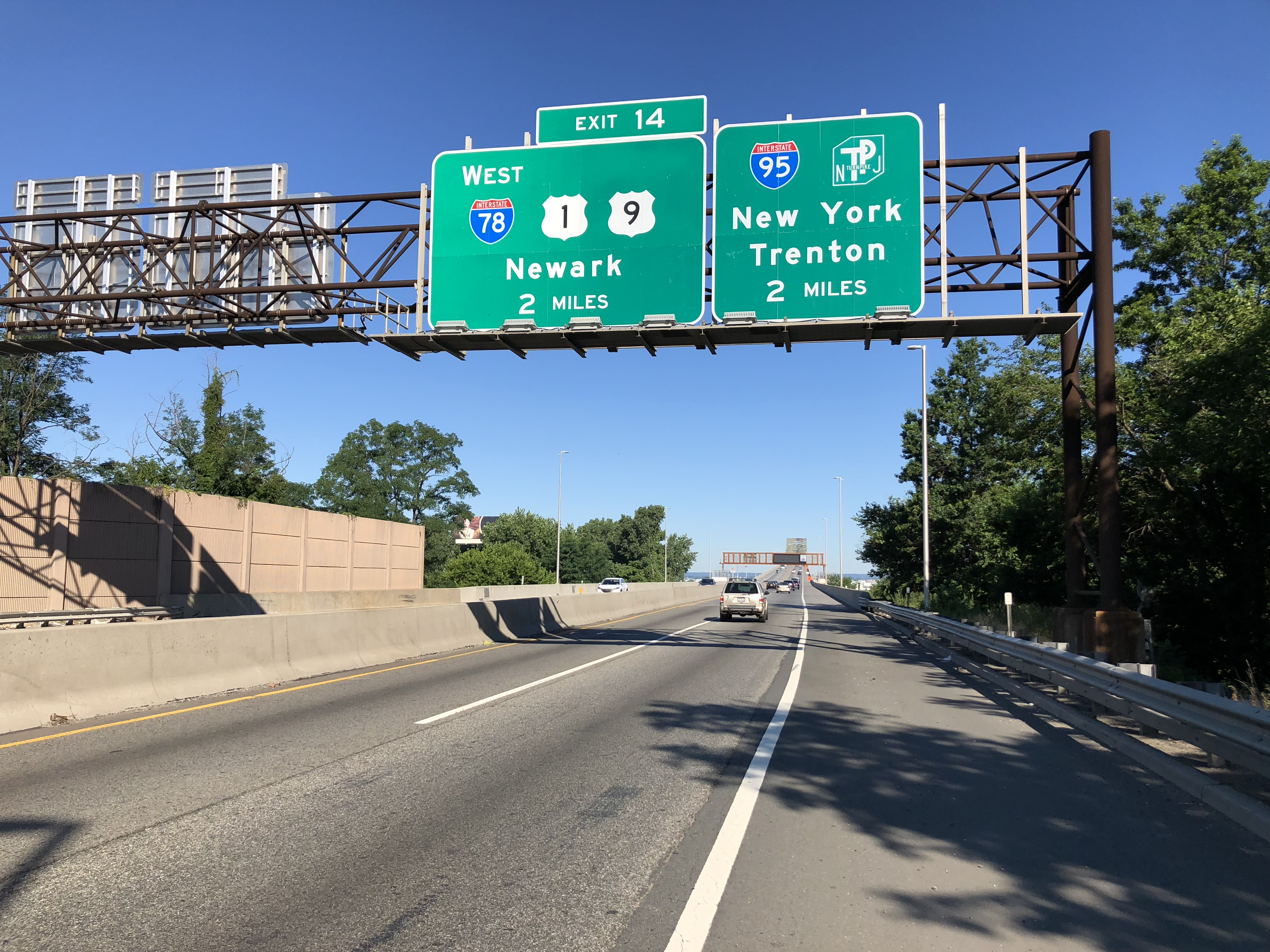
View west along Interstate 78 (New Jersey Turnpike Newark Bay Extension) in Bayonne

As of May 2010, the city had a total of 76.55 miles (123.20 km) of roadways, of which 65.78 miles (105.86 km) were maintained by the city, 4.82 miles (7.76 km) are overseen by Hudson County, 4.04 miles (6.50 km) by the New Jersey Department of Transportation and 1.91 miles (3.07 km) are the responsibility of the New Jersey Turnpike Authority.

The Bayonne Bridge stretches 1,775 feet (541 m), connecting south to Staten Island over the Kill Van Kull. Originally constructed in 1931, the bridge underwent a Navigation Clearance Project that was completed in 2017 at a cost of $1.7 billion, that raised the bridge deck from 151 feet (46 m) above the water to 215 feet (66 m), allowing larger and more heavily laden cargo ships to clear their way under the bridge.

Several major roadways pass through the city. The Newark Bay Extension (Interstate 78) of the New Jersey Turnpike eastbound travels to Jersey City and, via the Holland Tunnel, Manhattan. Westbound, the Newark Bay Bridge provides access to Newark, Newark Liberty International Airport and the rest of the turnpike (Interstate 95).

Kennedy Boulevard (County Route 501) is a major thoroughfare along the west side of the city from the Bayonne Bridge north to Jersey City and North Hudson.

Route 440 runs along the east side of Bayonne, and the West Side of Jersey City, partially following the path of the old Morris Canal route. It connects to the Bayonne Bridge, I-78, and to Route 185 to Liberty State Park.

=== Public transportation ===
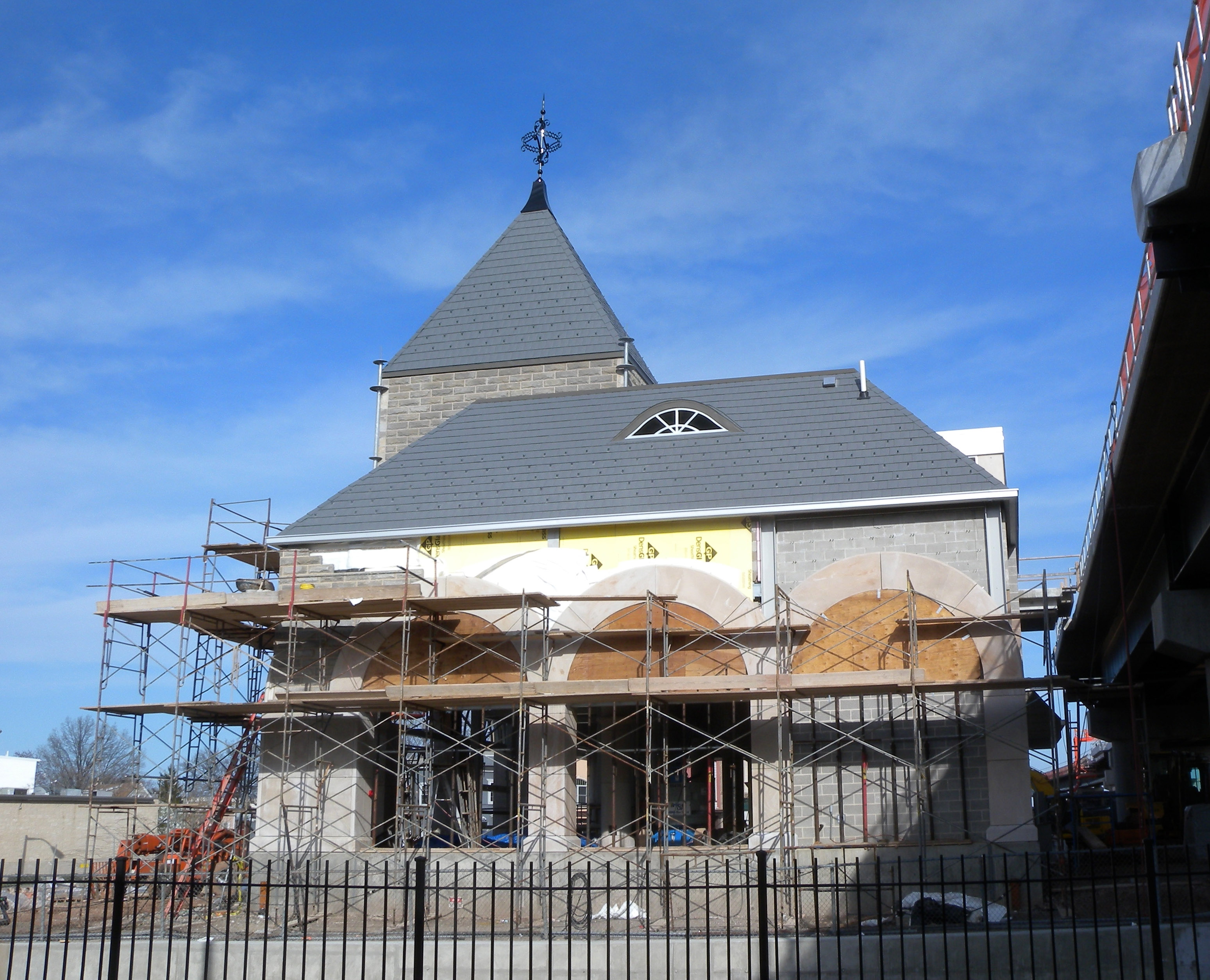
8th Street station

==== Rail ====
The Hudson-Bergen Light Rail has four stops in Bayonne, all originally station locations of the former Central Railroad of New Jersey (CNJ). They are located at 45th Street, 34th Street, 22nd Street, all just east of Avenue E, and 8th Street (the southern terminal of the 8th Street-Hoboken Line) at Avenue C, which opened in January 2011.

For 114 years, the CNJ ran frequent service through the city. Trains ran north to the Central Railroad of New Jersey Terminal in Jersey City. Trains ran west to Elizabethport, Elizabeth and Cranford for points west and south. The implementation of the Aldene Connection in 1967 bypassed CNJ trains around Bayonne so that nearly all trains would either terminate at Newark Penn Station or at Hoboken Terminal. By 1973, a lightly used shuttle between Bayonne and Cranford that operated 20 times per day was the final remnant of service on the line. Until August 6, 1978, a shuttle service between Bayonne and Cranford retained the last leg of service with the CNJ trains.

==== Bus ====
Bus transportation is provided on three main north–south streets of the city: Broadway, Kennedy Boulevard, and Avenue C, by NJ Transit (NJT). Several private bus lines once operated in Bayonne, but as of 2025 have all been replaced by NJ Transit. Route 12 (formerly Broadway Bus) runs solely inside Bayonne city limits along Broadway. The 10 and 119 run on Kennedy Boulevard providing service to the Journal Square Transportation Center in Jersey City and Port Authority Bus Terminal in Midtown Manhattan via the Lincoln Tunnel respectively. On Avenue C, the 120 runs to Battery Park in Downtown Manhattan via the Holland Tunnel during rush hours in peak direction while the 81 provides service to Exchange Place in Jersey City. Routes 6 and 8 also serve northern Bayonne.

MTA Regional Bus Operations provides bus service between Bayonne and Staten Island on the S89 route, which connects the 34th Street light rail station and the Eltingville neighborhood on Staten Island with no other stops in Bayonne. It is the first interstate bus service operated by the New York City Transit Authority.

==== Ferry ====
On December 17, 2025, Bayonne broke ground on a new ferry terminal at the former Military Ocean Terminal at 51 Port Terminal Boulevard. The ferry will be operated by NY Waterway and will carry passengers to New York.

== Points of interest ==
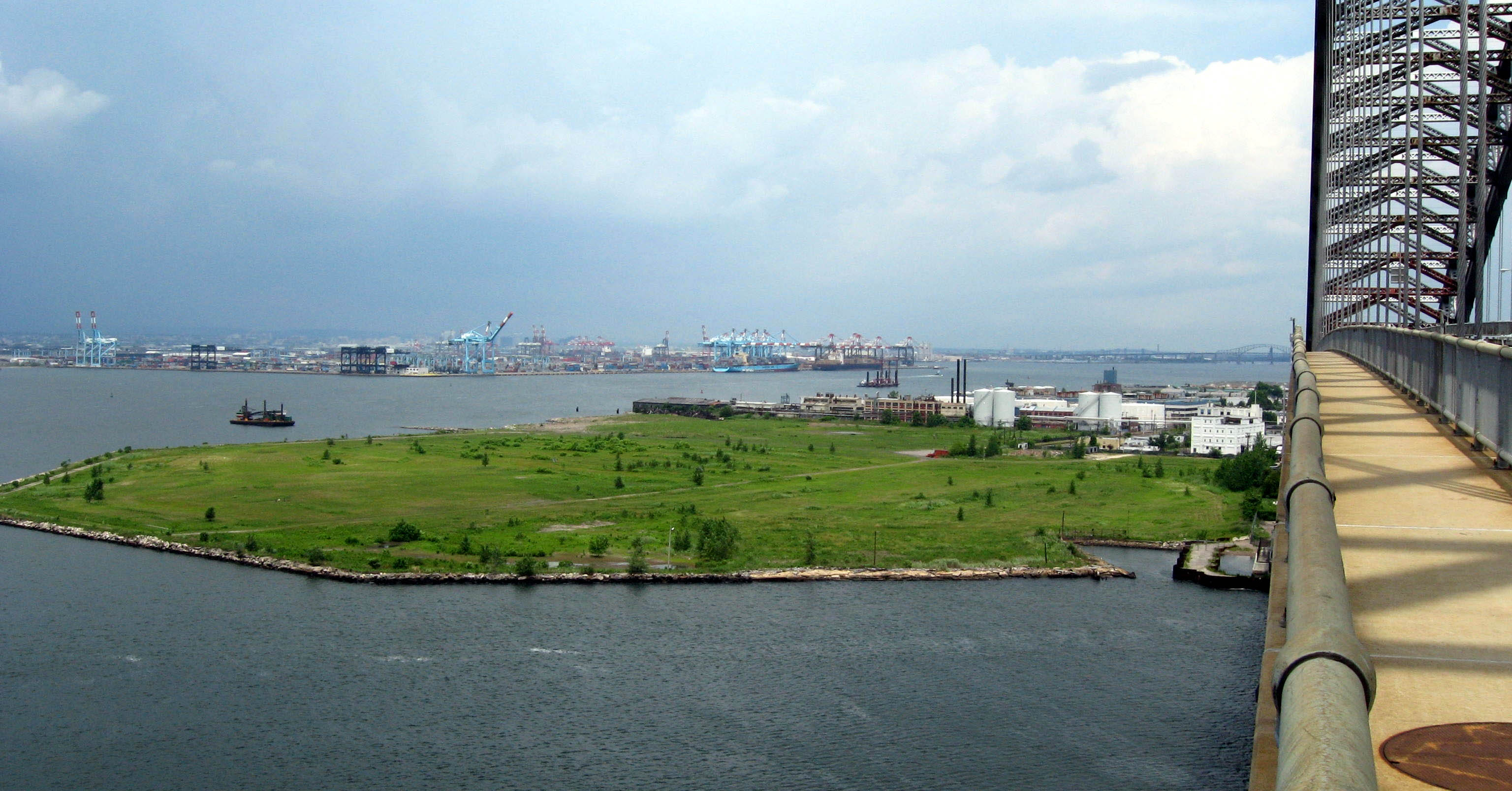
Kill Van Kull meets Newark Bay

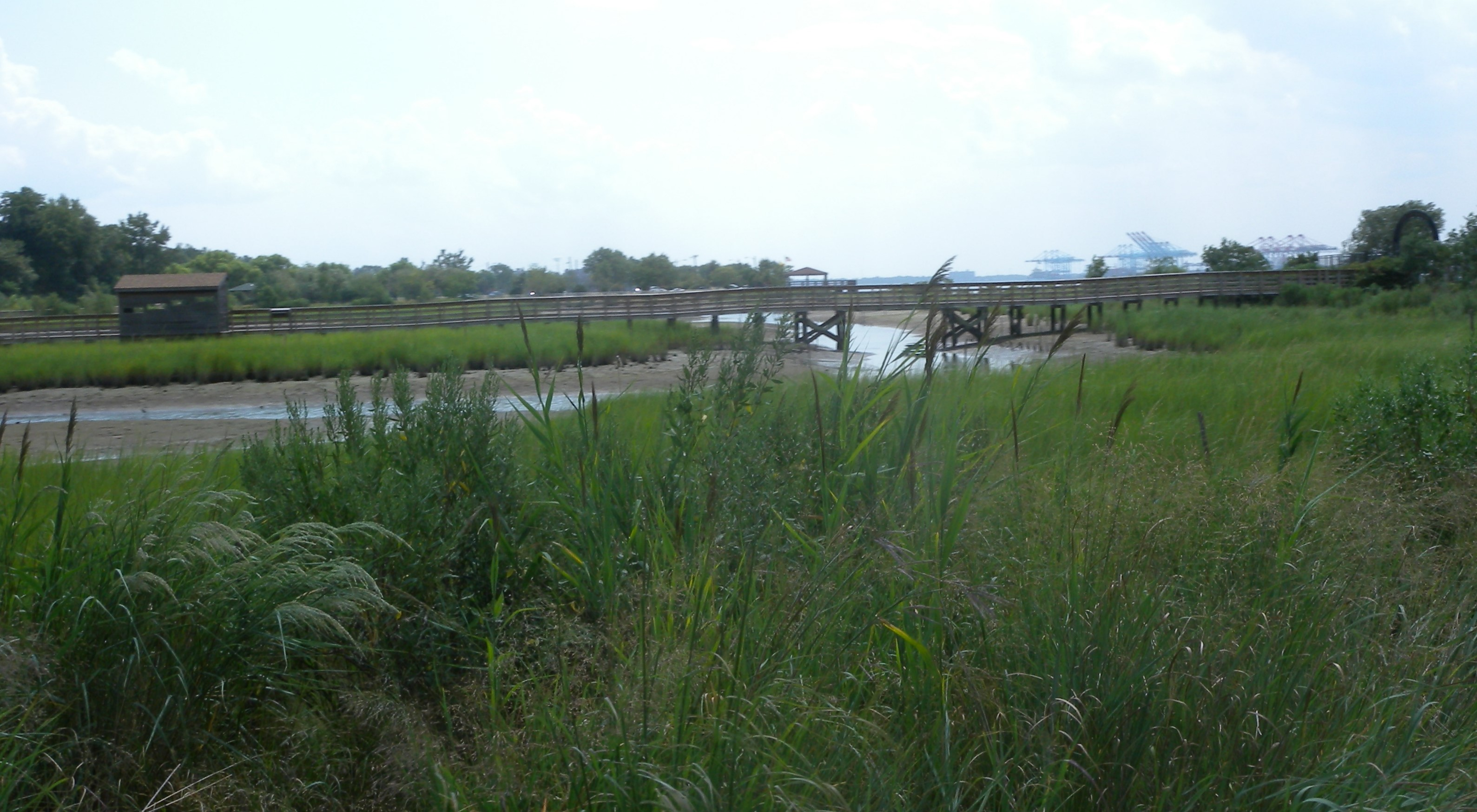
Rutkowski Park

- The Bayonne Bridge is the fifth-longest steel arch bridge in the world. For the more than 45 years from its dedication in 1931 until the completion of the New River Gorge Bridge, the Bayonne Bridge was the world's longest such bridge.
- Bergen Point
- Constable Hook is the site of two burials grounds known as the Constable Hook Cemetery, numerous tank farms and the Bayonne Golf Club, situated at the city's highest point
- Shooters Island, closed to the general public, is a 35 acres (14 ha) island—of which 7.5 acres (3.0 ha) are in Bayonne—that is operated as a bird sanctuary by the New York City Department of Parks and Recreation.
- To the Struggle Against World Terrorism is a 100-foot (30 m) high sculpture by Zurab Tsereteli located at the end of the former Military Ocean Terminal that was given to the United States as an official gift of the Russian government as a memorial to the victims of the September 11 terrorist attacks and the 1993 World Trade Center bombing. Russian President Vladimir Putin attended a groundbreaking ceremony in September 2005 and the monument was dedicated on September 11, 2006, in a ceremony attended by former President Bill Clinton as the keynote speaker.

=== National Registered Historic Places and museums ===
See List of Registered Historic Places in Hudson County, New Jersey

- Bayonne Truck House No. 1, home to Bayonne Firefighters Museum
- Bayonne Trust Company, home to Bayonne Community Museum
- First Reformed Dutch Church of Bergen Neck, constructed in 1866.
- Robbins Reef Light – Built to serve ships heading into New York Harbor, the current structure at the site dates to 1883, replacing an earlier lighthouse constructed in 1839.
- St. Vincent de Paul R.C. Church, constructed 1927–1930.
- Hale-Whitney Mansion

== Notable people ==
People who were born in, residents of, or otherwise closely associated with Bayonne include ((B) denotes that the person was born in the city):

- Marc Acito (born 1966), playwright, novelist and humorist (B)
- Walker Lee Ashley (born 1960), linebacker who played seven seasons in the NFL, for the Minnesota Vikings and Kansas City Chiefs (B)
- Herbert R. Axelrod (1927–2017), tropical fish expert who was sentenced to prison in a tax fraud case (B)
- Louis Ayres (1874–1947), architect best known for designing the United States Memorial Chapel at the Meuse-Argonne American Cemetery and Memorial and the Herbert C. Hoover U.S. Department of Commerce Building (B)
- Alexander Barkan (1909–1990), head of the AFL–CIO's Committee on Political Education 1963–1982, and an original member of Nixon's Enemies List (B)
- Allan Benny (1867–1942), Bayonne council member who later represented New Jersey's 9th congressional district 1903–1905
- Ben Bernie (1891–1943), bandleader, author, violinist, composer and conductor who wrote Sweet Georgia Brown (B)
- Richard Halsey Best (1910–2001), dive bomber pilot and squadron commander in the United States Navy during World War II (B)
- Tammy Blanchard (born 1976), actress who won an Emmy Award for her portrayal of Judy Garland in Life with Judy Garland: Me and My Shadows
- Marcy Borders (1973–2015), bank clerk who was known as "the dust lady" for an iconic photo taken of her after she survived the collapse of the World Trade Center
- Joe Borowski (born 1971), professional baseball player for the Cleveland Indians
- Kenny Britt (born 1988), wide receiver for the New England Patriots (B)
- Dick Brodowski (1932–2019), Major League Baseball pitcher, who came up with the Boston Red Sox as a 19-year-old
- Clem Burke (born 1954), drummer who was an original member of the band Blondie (B)
- Scott Byers (born 1958), former American football defensive back who played in the NFL for the San Diego Chargers (B)
- Walter Chandoha (1920–2019), animal photographer, known especially for his 90,000 photographs of cats (B)
- Leon Charney (1938–2016), real estate tycoon, author, philanthropist, political pundit and media personality (B)
- Cy Chermak (1929–2021), producer and screenwriter, notable for producing the crime drama television series CHiPs and Ironside (B)
- Stanley Chesney (1910–1978), soccer player and National Soccer Hall of Fame inductee (B)
- Anthony Chiappone (born 1957), indicted politician who served in the New Jersey General Assembly, where he represented the 31st Legislative District 2004–2005 and again from 2007 until his resignation in 2010
- Robert Coello (born 1984), MLB pitcher who has played for the Boston Red Sox, Toronto Blue Jays and the Los Angeles Angels of Anaheim
- Robert B. Cohen (1925–2012), founder of the Hudson News chain of newsstands that began in 1987 with a single location at LaGuardia Airport (B)
- Dennis P. Collins (1924–2009), former mayor of Bayonne who served four terms in office, 1974–1990
- George Cummings (1938–2024), guitarist for the 1970s pop band, Dr. Hook & The Medicine Show
- Bert Daly (1881–1952), physician and MLB infielder for the Philadelphia Athletics who served five terms as mayor of Bayonne (B)
- Tom De Haven (born 1949), author, editor and journalist (B)
- Sandra Dee (1942–2005), actress best known for her role as Gidget (B)
- Teresa Demjanovich (1901–1927), Ruthenian Catholic Sister of Charity, who has been beatified by the Catholic Church (B)
- Martin Dempsey (born 1952), retired United States Army general who served as the 18th chairman of the Joint Chiefs of Staff from October 1, 2011, until September 25, 2015
- Rich Dimler (born 1956), former nose tackle for the Cleveland Browns and Green Bay Packers (B)
- James P. Dugan (1929–2021), former member of the New Jersey Senate who served as chairman of the New Jersey Democratic State Committee (B)
- William Abner Eddy (1850–1909), accountant and journalist famous for his photographic and meteorological experiments with kites.
- Michael Thomas Embrich, government official who was nominated in 2026 as the first Veteran Advocate of the State of New Jersey
- Michael Farber (born 1951), author and sports journalist, writer with Sports Illustrated 1994–2014
- Sherif Farrag (born 1987), attorney who competed in the 2012 Summer Olympic Games as a foilist (B)
- Barney Frank (1940–2026), member of the United States House of Representatives from Massachusetts 1981–2013 (B)
- Billy Gallagher (c. 1869–1934), businessman and restaurant owner, whose Times Square cabarets and night clubs were known for their entertainment, celebrities and late night festivities
- Rich Glover (born 1950), former professional football player, who played defensive tackle in the NFL for the New York Giants and Philadelphia Eagles (B)
- Joshua Gomez (born 1975), actor best known for his role as Morgan Grimes on Chuck (B)
- Rick Gomez (born 1972), actor who played George Luz in HBO's Band of Brothers and as "Endless Mike" Hellstrom in The Adventures of Pete and Pete (B)
- Arielle Holmes (born 1993), actress and writer best known for starring as a lightly fictionalized version of herself in the film Heaven Knows What
- Danan Hughes (born 1970), former football wide receiver who played in the NFL for the Kansas City Chiefs (B)
- Nathan L. Jacobs (1905–1989), Justice of the New Jersey Supreme Court in 1948 and 1952–1975
- Herman Kahn (1922–1983), military strategist
- Brian Keith (1921–1997), film and TV actor who appeared in The Russians Are Coming, the Russians Are Coming and as Uncle Bill in Family Affair (B)
- Frank Langella (born 1940), actor who has appeared in over 70 productions including Dave and Good Night, and Good Luck (B)
- Bob Latour (1925–2010), swimming coach who organized and served as the first coach of the men's swimming team at Bucknell University 1956–1968 (B)
- Joseph A. LeFante (1928–1977), politician who represented New Jersey's 14th congressional district 1977–1978 (B)
- Jammal Lord (born 1981), former safety for the Houston Texans
- Donald MacAdie (1899–1963), Suffragan Bishop of the Episcopal Diocese of Newark 1958–1963
- George R. R. Martin (born 1948), author and screenwriter of science fiction, horror, and fantasy (B)
- Pat Colasurdo Mayo (born 1957), former basketball player who played professionally for the San Francisco Pioneers in the Women's Professional Basketball League
- Benjamin Melniker (1913–2018), film producer who was an executive producer with Michael E. Uslan on the Batman film series (B)
- Miriam Moskowitz (1916–2018), schoolteacher who served two years in prison after being convicted for conspiracy as an atomic spy for the Soviet Union
- Devora Nadworney (1895–1948), contralto singer who, in 1928, became the first singer heard over a radio network in the United States
- Francis M. Nevins (born 1943), mystery writer, attorney, and professor of law (B)
- Samuel Irving Newhouse Sr. (1895–1979), publishing and broadcasting executive who founded Advance Publications
- Jim Norton (born 1968), standup comedian known for The Opie & Anthony Show, the Jim Norton & Sam Roberts show and The Tonight Show with Jay Leno
- Denise O'Connor (born 1935), fencer who competed for the United States in the women's team foil events at the 1964 and 1976 Summer Olympics (B)
- Jason O'Donnell (born 1971), member of the New Jersey General Assembly who represented the 31st Legislative District 2010–2016
- Gene Olaff (1920–2017), early professional soccer goalie (B)
- Peter George Olenchuk (1922–2000), United States Army Major General
- Shaquille O'Neal (born 1972), all-star basketball player for various NBA teams. O'Neal moved to Bayonne when he was five, and lived there for two years.
- Nicholas Oresko (1917–2013), United States Army Master Sergeant and recipient of the Medal of Honor (B)
- Ronald Roberts (born 1991), professional basketball player who played for Hapoel Jerusalem of the Israeli Premier League
- Steven V. Roberts (born 1943), journalist, writer and political commentator
- William Sampson (born 1989), politician who has represented the 31st Legislative District in the New Jersey General Assembly since 2022 (B)
- Dick Savitt (1927–2023), tennis player who reached a ranking of second in the world (B)
- William Shemin (1896–1973), U.S. Army sergeant, Medal of Honor recipient and namesake of the William Shemin Midtown Community School (B)
- William N. Stape (born 1968), screenwriter and magazine writer who wrote episodes of Star Trek: The Next Generation and Star Trek: Deep Space Nine
- Corey Stokes (born 1988), college basketball player for Villanova University (B)
- Robert Tepper (born 1953), singer/songwriter best known for the song "No Easy Way Out" from the Rocky IV motion picture soundtrack (B)
- Joseph W. Tumulty (1914–1996), attorney and politician who represented the 32nd Legislative District for a single four-year term in the New Jersey Senate
- James Urbaniak (born 1963), film and TV actor best known for his role as the voice of Dr. Thaddeus Venture in The Venture Bros. (B)
- Michael E. Uslan (born 1951), originator and executive producer of the Batman/Dark Knight/Joker movie franchise
- Chuck Wepner (born 1939), hard-luck boxer who was known as "The Bayonne Bleeder"
- George Wiley (1931–1973), chemist and civil rights leader (B)
- Zakk Wylde (born 1967), hard rock and heavy metal guitarist (B)
