= Bob Latour =

American swimming coach and college athletics administrator

Biographical details
- Born: May 11, 1925; Bayonne, New Jersey, U.S.
- Died: November 18, 2010 (aged 85)

Administrative career (AD unless noted)
- 1968–1978: Bucknell

Robert A. Latour (May 11, 1925 – November 18, 2010) was an American swimming coach and college athletics administrator. He graduated from Ohio Wesleyan University in 1949 and received a master's degree from Springfield College in 1955. He organized and served as the first coach of the men's swimming team at Bucknell University from 1956 to 1968; he led Bucknell's swimming team to six Middle Atlantic Conference championship and the 1964 NCAA College Division championship, Bucknell's only NCAA team title in any sport. He served as Bucknell's director of athletics and physical education from 1968 to 1978. During his tenure as athletic director, Gerhard Fieldhouse was built and the school added men's lacrosse, cross country, indoor track and field and water polo programs. Latour also coached Bucknell's freshman football team for 11 seasons and was a member of the NCAA Division II Football Committee from 1973 to 1978, including two years as its chairman from 1976 to 1978.
