= Stanley Chesney =

American soccer player

Stan Chesney
Personal information
- Full name: Stanley Chesney
- Date of birth: January 10, 1910
- Place of birth: Bayonne, New Jersey, United States
- Date of death: January 1978 (aged 67–68)
- Place of death: Bayonne, New Jersey, United States
- Position: Goalkeeper

Senior career*
Years	Team	Apps	(Gls)
- Bayonne Rovers
- Babcock & Wilcox
1931–	New York Americans		
- * Club domestic league appearances and goals

Stanley Chesney (January 19, 1910 – January 1978) was an all around athlete best known as a U.S. soccer goalkeeper. He played in both the first and second American Soccer League and was inducted into the National Soccer Hall of Fame in 1966.

Chesney attended Bayonne High School, where he also played varsity baseball and basketball. Chesney was signed out of high school by Branch Rickey to play baseball for the St. Louis Cardinals minor league organization. He also led his semi-pro NJ basketball team in scoring and was a local handball champion.

According to the National Soccer Hall of Fame, Chesney signed with the Bayonne Rovers when he was seventeen. At some point, he also played for Babcock & Wilcox. However, there are no records of these teams competing in the mid to late 1920s. At some point, he signed with the New York Americans of the first American Soccer League. He saw time in three games with the Americans during the fall 1931 ASL season. Chesney had a remarkable 17-year career with the Americans. In 1933, they fell to Stix, Baer and Fuller F.C. in the final of the National Challenge Cup. In 1937, they won the cup over St. Louis Shamrocks. The Americans also won the 1936 ASL championship. At some point in the mid-1940s, Chesney may have retired as he came out of retirement in 1948 to rejoin the New York Americans.
