= Billy Gallagher (businessman) =

American restaurateur (c. 1869 – 1934)

- Born: c. 1869; Camden, New Jersey, US
- Died: March 5, 1934 (aged 64–65); New York City, US
- Occupations: Businessman and restaurant owner
- Known for: Cabaret business
- Children: 3, (including Walter Gallagher)

William J. Gallagher (c. 1869 – March 5, 1934) was an American businessman and New York City restaurant owner, whose Times Square cabarets and night clubs were known for their entertainment, celebrities and late night festivities. He operated establishments along Broadway in Midtown Manhattan for more than four decades, from the time he arrived in New York around 1890 until his death.

== Early life ==
Gallagher was born in Camden, New Jersey, in 1869. His father owned a saloon in Camden. He left for New York City when he was 18 years old.

== Career ==
Gallagher moved to New York in 1887, and worked in a restaurant. He was a part-owner of a restaurant on Carmine Street from 1894, and opened a restaurant named Broadway Gardens at 711 Seventh Avenue in 1911, which developed a reputation for good luck, based on the number of the address. He also ran a restaurant in Times Square near 47th Street, where he introduced singing waiters, a gimmick that had begun in the Bowery.

Gallagher was well-known in the cabaret business, and was nicknamed "Little Billy," due to his height of 5 ft 5 in (1.65 m). The New York Times described his cabaret as one that opened after the sun set and picked up business when other establishments closed at midnight, remaining open until dawn with a mix of "reputable people" and those "who had practical reasons for circulating after dark". After New York City passed a curfew law requiring establishments to close at 1:00 am, Gallagher had at first observed the letter of the law, but ultimately developed a workaround under which patrons would be escorted out when the curfew went into effect and then would be welcomed back in after 15 minutes to continue their partying.

During the Prohibition Era, Gallagher's establishments were among the first that were padlocked by U.S. Attorney Emory Buckner. In 1923, Abigail Harding, sister of then-President Warren G. Harding, visited Gallagher's establishment in Times Square.

In 1923, Gallagher took over management of the Monte Carlo restaurant at 51st Street and Broadway, with National Hotel Review calling him "one of the most popular cabaret owners in the city."

Then a resident of Bayonne, New Jersey, Gallagher opened Club Lido in 1932, a nightclub on 52nd Street and Broadway, where he preferentially hired staff from Bayonne and other areas nearby in New Jersey. Gallagher advertised a revue by Charles Elbey that advertised 16 blondes, brunettes, and redheads.

== Personal life and legacy ==
Over his career, notable patrons of his establishments and personal friends included Mayor of New York City Jimmy Walker and heavyweight boxers Jack Dempsey and Luis Ángel Firpo. Singer Helen Morgan kicked off her professional career after being asked to sing at the piano while dining at one of Gallagher's restaurants.

His son, Walter Gallagher, became chief of police in Hackensack, New Jersey; he had two other sons, Bernard and Joseph.

A resident of Jackson Heights, Queens, Gallagher died on March 5, 1934, in New York, and was buried on March 8 in Calvary Cemetery in Camden. He was known to be generous to people who asked him for money, particularly to those who had been his customers in the past. Over his lifetime he had amassed a fortune estimated at $1 million (equivalent to $24 million in 2024), which he gave away to friends and to the needy.
