= Morris Warman =

American photographer

Morris Warman (December 25, 1918 – April 16, 2010) was an American photographer. His pictures often appeared on the front page of the New York Herald Tribune, where he was a staff photographer from 1943 to 1966. His work in photojournalism was distinguished by his use of ambient light instead of flash to create artistic pictures of daily news events. He also received acclaim for his portraits of statesmen and other celebrities, which were displayed in exhibits such as Portraits of Our Time. He won several awards for his work, including the New York Press Photographers Association contest in 1959.

In his 1986 book on the New York Herald Tribune, entitled The Paper, writer Richard Kluger described Warman as "the best portraitist in U.S. daily journalism."
