= Empty Sky (disambiguation) =

Empty Sky is a 1969 album by Elton John.

Empty Sky may also refer to:

== Music ==
- Empty Sky, a 1996 album by Bonnie Hayes
- Empty Sky, a 2011 album by Deuter
- "Empty Sky", a song by Bruce Springsteen on his 2002 album The Rising
- "Empty Sky", a song by Buried Alive on their 1999 album The Death of Your Perfect World
- "Empty Sky", a song by Edmond Leung on his 1994 album Don't Wanna Be Alone
- "Empty Sky", a song by Stiff Little Fingers on their album Guitar and Drum
- Empty Sky, a 1970s rock band created by James LoMenzo

== Other uses ==
- Empty Sky (memorial), a September 11 memorial in New Jersey, United States
- Empty Sky, a play written by Sarah Treem
- The Empty Sky, a novel by Tasman Beattie which was adapted in to the Australian miniseries A Thousand Skies
