= The Story of June =

Studio album by Edmond Leung
- Released: 15 June 2006
- Genre: Cantopop
- Length: 36:58
- Label: Gold Label

Edmond Leung chronology
Effort & Love (2004)	The Story of June (2006)	Love & Peace (2009)

The Story of June is a Cantopop album by Edmond Leung.

== Track listing ==
1. Love Blind (戀愛盲)
2. Elevator Men (電梯男)
3. Hey June
4. Driven To Distraction (失魂落魄)
5. Daydream (白日夢)
6. Romantic (羅曼蒂克)
7. Y3
8. Get Away with Miriam Yeung (滾)
9. The Aftermath (戰後餘生)
10. The Long Journey (路漫漫)

== Music awards ==
Year	Ceremony	Award
2006	The Metro Showbiz Hit Awards	Hit Duet Song - Get Away with Miriam Yeung (滾)
