= 20 (Edmond Leung album) =

#20

Studio album by Edmond Leung
- Released: 8 September 2011
- Genre: Cantopop
- Length: 38:44
- Label: Gold Typhoon

Edmond Leung chronology
Love & Peace (2009)	#20 (2011)	E.d.M.O.N.D (2013)

#20 is a Cantopop album by Edmond Leung. It is so named because it is the 20th studio album by him (excluding compilation and concert albums). It also forms his 20th anniversary project since 2009.

== Track listing ==
1. Center Forward (中鋒)
2. Lazy Pronunciation Song (懶音哥)
3. Asking Why Once and Again (一再問究竟)
4. Vintage (古著)
5. Dress Circle (超等後座)
6. Love Affair (外遇)
7. I Am Afraid That I Will Fall in Love With You (我怕我會愛上你)
8. Flower Will Not Bloom (花不會盛開)
9. Center (Winning'11 Remix)
10. Lazy Song (Canton Battle Remix)
11. Growing Younger Overnight with Dicky Cheung (一夜年少, Mandopop)

== Music awards ==
Year	Ceremony	Award
2011
2011	The Metro Showbiz Hit Awards	Hit Song – Asking Why Once and Again (一再問究竟)
2011	Jade Solid Gold Best Ten Music Awards Presentation	Top 10 Song Awards – Asking Why Once and Again (一再問究竟)
