= Liberty State Park =

Park on Upper New York Bay in Jersey City, New Jersey

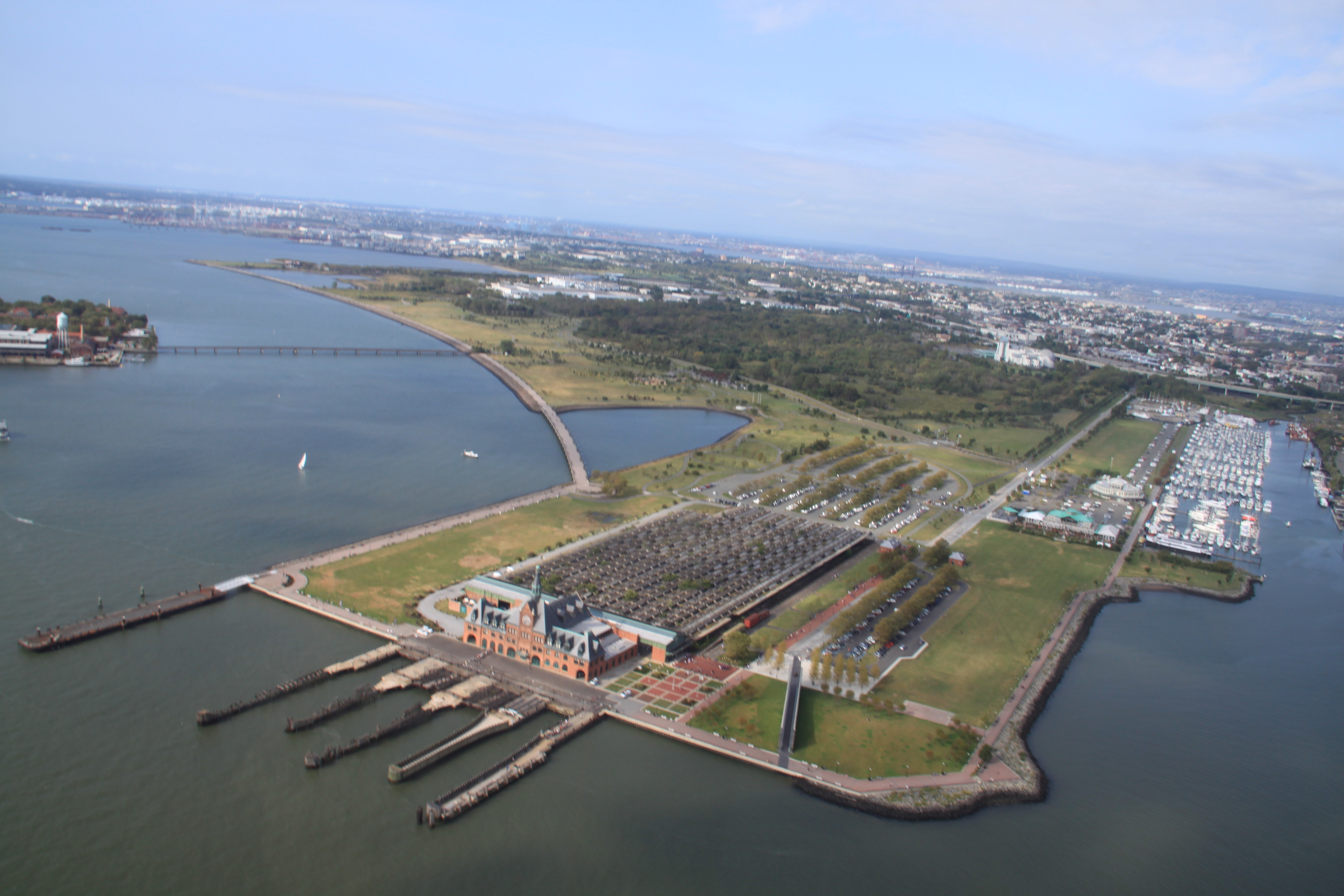
- Liberty State Park as seen at the mouth of the Hudson River in September 2012
- Interactive map of Liberty State Park
- Type: Urban park
- Location: Jersey City, New Jersey, U.S.
- Coordinates: 40°42′15″N 74°02′57″W
- Area: 1,212 acres (4.90 km^{2})
- Operator: New Jersey Division of Parks and Forestry
- Open: June 14, 1976
- Website: Official website

Liberty State Park (LSP) is a 1,212 acres (490 ha) state park in the U.S. state of New Jersey, located on Upper New York Bay in Jersey City opposite Liberty Island and Ellis Island. The park opened in 1976 to coincide with bicentennial celebrations and is operated and maintained by the New Jersey Division of Parks and Forestry. Statue City Cruises provides ferry service from the Central Railroad of New Jersey Terminal to Liberty Island and Ellis Island.

The park is the largest in Jersey City, the largest urban park in the state, the most visited New Jersey state park and one of the most visited state parks in the United States with approximately 4.5 million visitors each year as of 2025.

The main part of the park is bordered by water on three sides: on the north by the Morris Canal Big Basin and on the south and east by Upper New York Bay. The New Jersey Turnpike Newark Bay Extension, which is part of I-78, marks its western perimeter.

== Geography ==
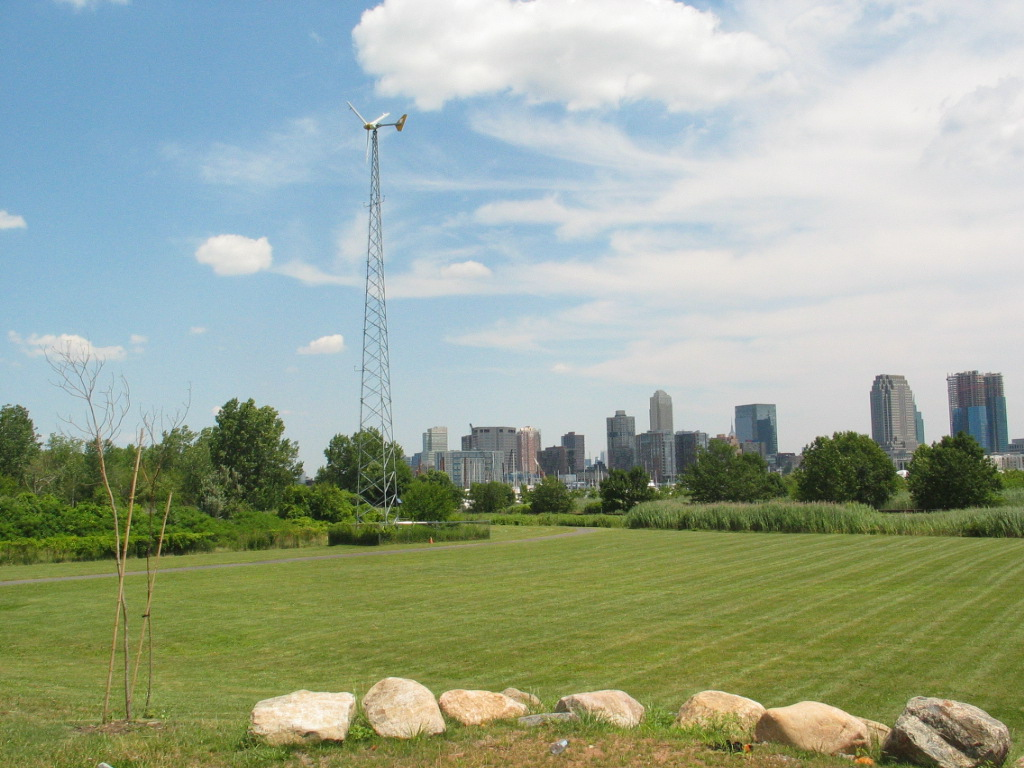
The high rise buildings of the Jersey City skyline as seen from Liberty State Park

Communipaw Cove is part of the 36-acre (15 ha) state nature preserve in the park and is one of the few remaining tidal salt marshes along the Hudson River estuary. The Nature Center, designed by architect Michael Graves, is part of the preserve. To the west lies the Interior Natural Area, which is off limits to the public and is being allowed through natural processes to recover from environmental abuse.

At the center of the park, 240 acres have been fenced off and contaminated with hazardous materials, such as chromium, arsenic, and petroleum. The six acre train shed is also fenced off and contaminated with asbestos.

== History ==
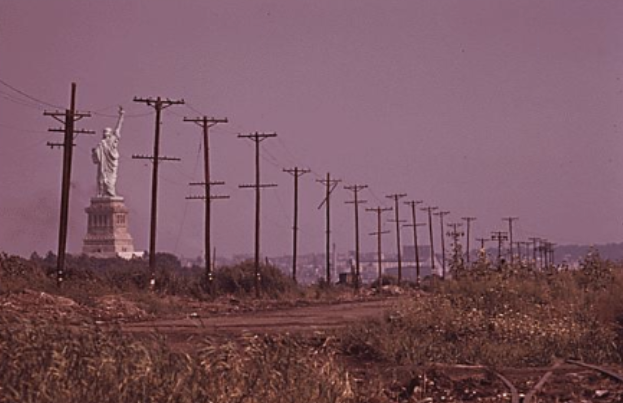
Before opening in June 1976, Liberty State Park was the site of abandoned rail facilities built on landfills.

Much of the park is situated on landfilled tidal flats. In the latter half of 19th century, a small island named Black Tom was joined via landfill with the mainland. It became a major shipping, manufacturing, and transportation hub within Port of New York and New Jersey, leading to the construction of Communipaw Terminal. It was from this ferry/train station that an estimated 10.5 million immigrants, roughly two-thirds that were processed at Ellis Island, entered Jersey City to spread out across the United States. In 1916, on what is now the southeastern corner of the park, the Black Tom explosion killed as many as seven people, caused $20 million in property damage, and was felt throughout the Tri-State Region.

The park was conceived in the 1960s. with the land transferred from the city to the state in 1965. Jersey City residents Audrey Zapp, Theodore Conrad, Morris Pesin and J. Owen Grundy were influential environmentalists and historians who spearheaded the movement that led to the creation of Liberty State Park. They are remembered by the naming of places and streets along the waterfront.

It is estimated the park suffered $20 million in damages during Superstorm Sandy in October 2012. In June 2016, the Central Railroad of New Jersey Terminal reopened after a $20 million renovation to repair the extensive damage caused by Sandy. The Nature Center reopened in June 2021.

On January 11, 2018, it was announced by New Jersey Department of Environmental Protection (NJDEP) that the interior 240 acres (97.1 ha) of the park that have been closed off to the public for decades due to hazardous material and severely contaminated land would be remediated for the entire community to safely enjoy. The restoration is to be done in phases with the initial phase focusing on a 23 acres (9.3 ha) parcel of the interior. There is currently no firm timeline yet for the remediation but the funding is to come from natural resource damage settlements. Work was slated to begin in 2021 and ultimately began in 2023. In 2024, the NJDEP announced an additional $7.3 million the continued revitalization efforts. In January 2026, the New Jersey Department of Environmental Protection announced the start of construction on several projects included in the Liberty State Park Master Plan, including improvements to the Central Railroad of New Jersey Terminal Plaza, development of athletic fields and a picnic area at Marina Green, and restoration of the historic train shed.

== Points of interest ==
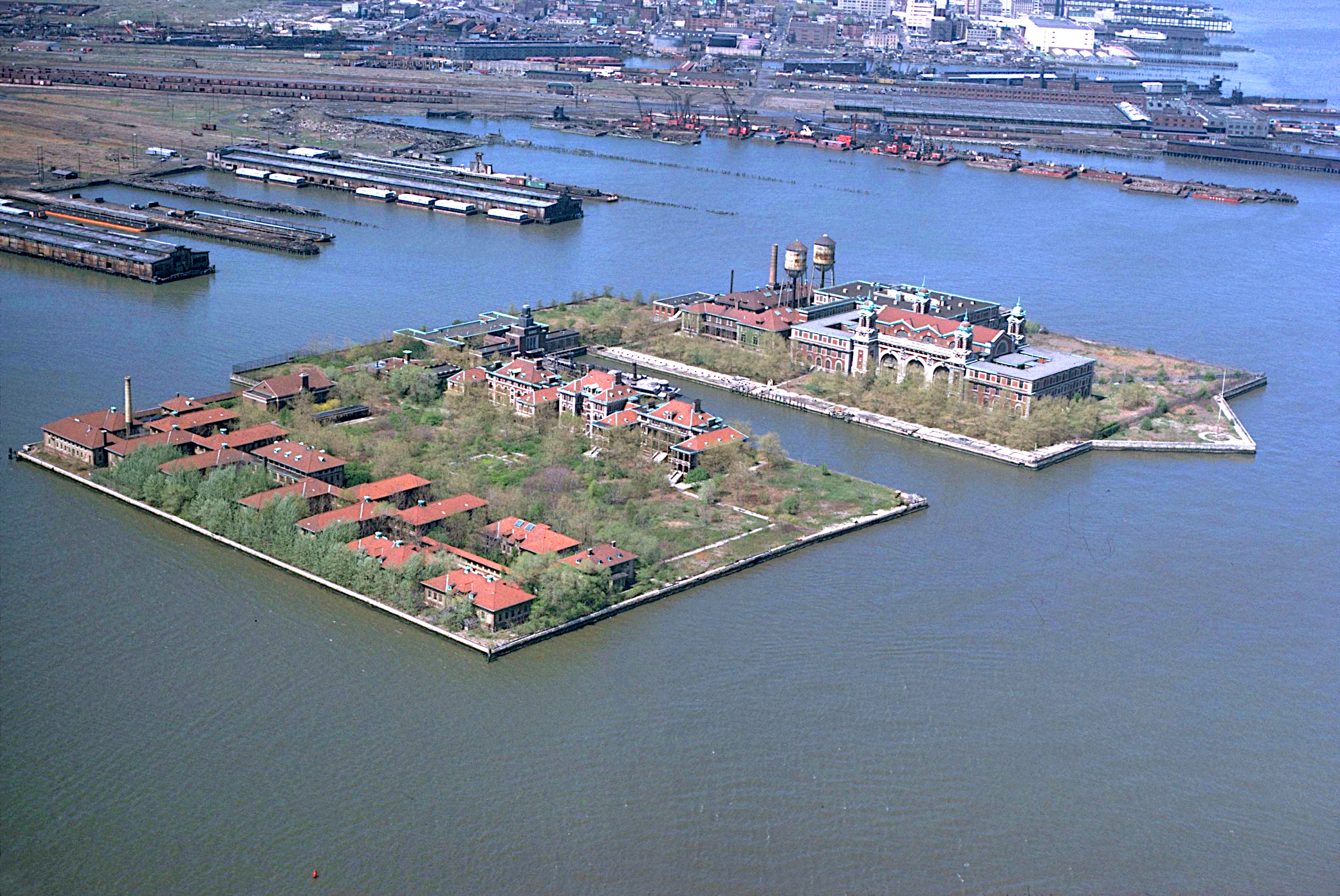
Ellis Island and the railyards and piers of Central Railroad of New Jersey before development of the park and associated restoration projects

=== Central Railroad of New Jersey Terminal ===
On the northern most shore of the park is The Central Railroad of New Jersey (CRRNJ) Terminal. The terminal operated from 1889 to 1964 and also served the Central Railroad of New Jersey-operated Reading Railroad, the Baltimore and Ohio Railroad, and the Lehigh Valley Railroad. An estimated 10.5 million immigrants that were processed at Ellis Island entered the United States through the station. Today, it serves as a museum and ticket office for ferry service to Ellis Island and Liberty Island which operates from the Hudson River side of the terminal.

=== Freedom Way and Liberty Walkway ===
Liberty Walkway, a crescent-shaped promenade, stretches from the CRRNJ Terminal along the waterfront south to the Statue of Liberty overlook, bridging two coves along the way. It is part of the longer Hudson River Waterfront Walkway. Halfway along Liberty Walkway is a bridge to Ellis Island, but only authorized vehicles are allowed. The southeastern corner of the park contains the Statue of Liberty overlook, picnic facilities, a playground, the U.S. Flag Plaza and Liberation Monument, the Public Administration Building, and a memorial to the Black Tom explosions. Picnicking and barbecuing facilities are also located at the southern end of the park. Originally called "Liberty Walk", this part of the project won a landscape award in 1995.

=== Liberty Science Center ===
Liberty Science Center, which lies in the western portion of the park, is an interactive science museum and learning center. The center opened in 1993 as New Jersey's first major state science museum. It has science exhibits, the world's 5th largest IMAX Dome theater, the largest planetarium in the Western Hemisphere, numerous educational resources, and the original Hoberman sphere, a silver, computer-driven engineering artwork designed by Chuck Hoberman. The museum also houses naked mole-rats.

=== Monuments and memorials ===
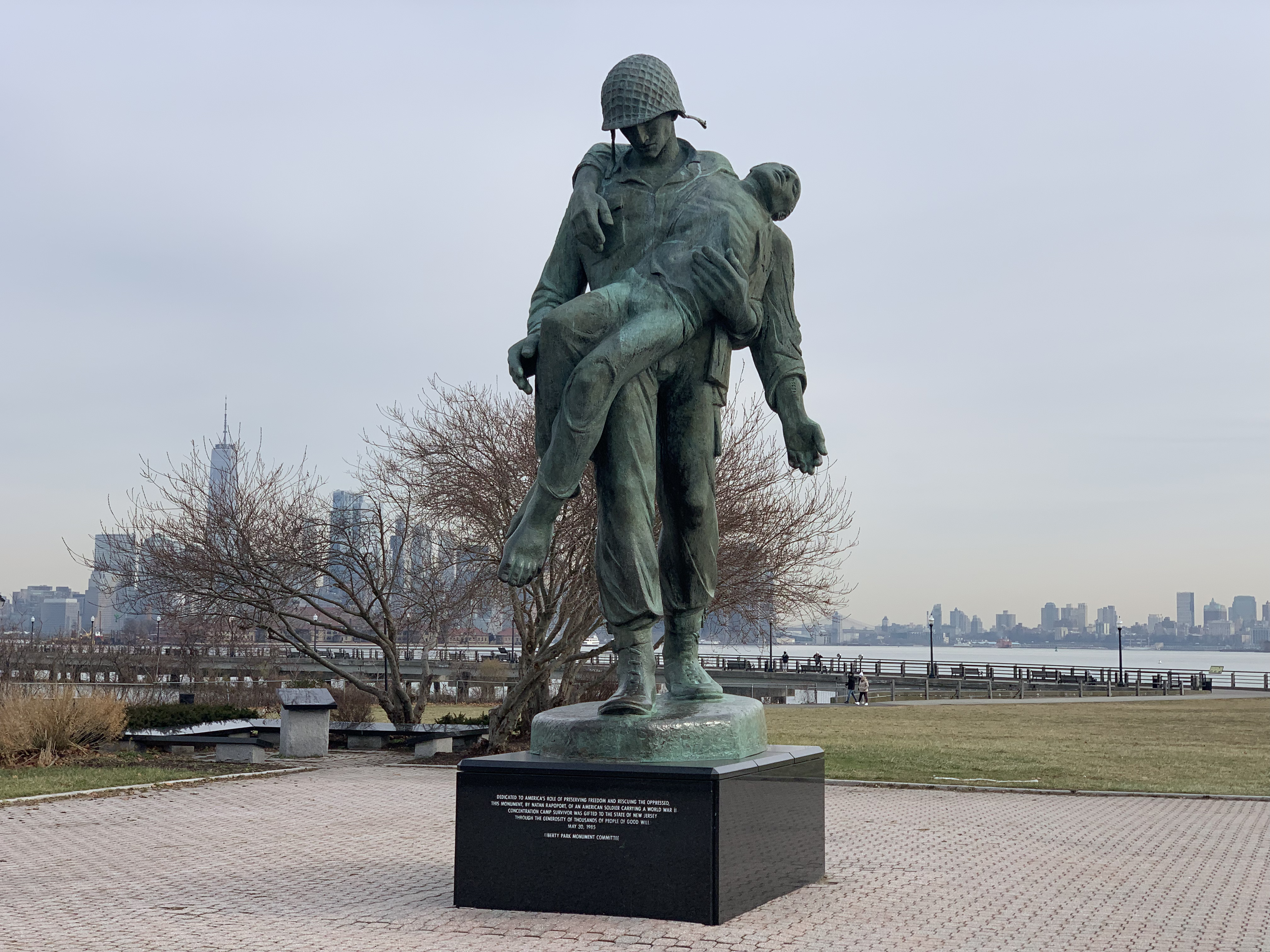
Liberation Memorial

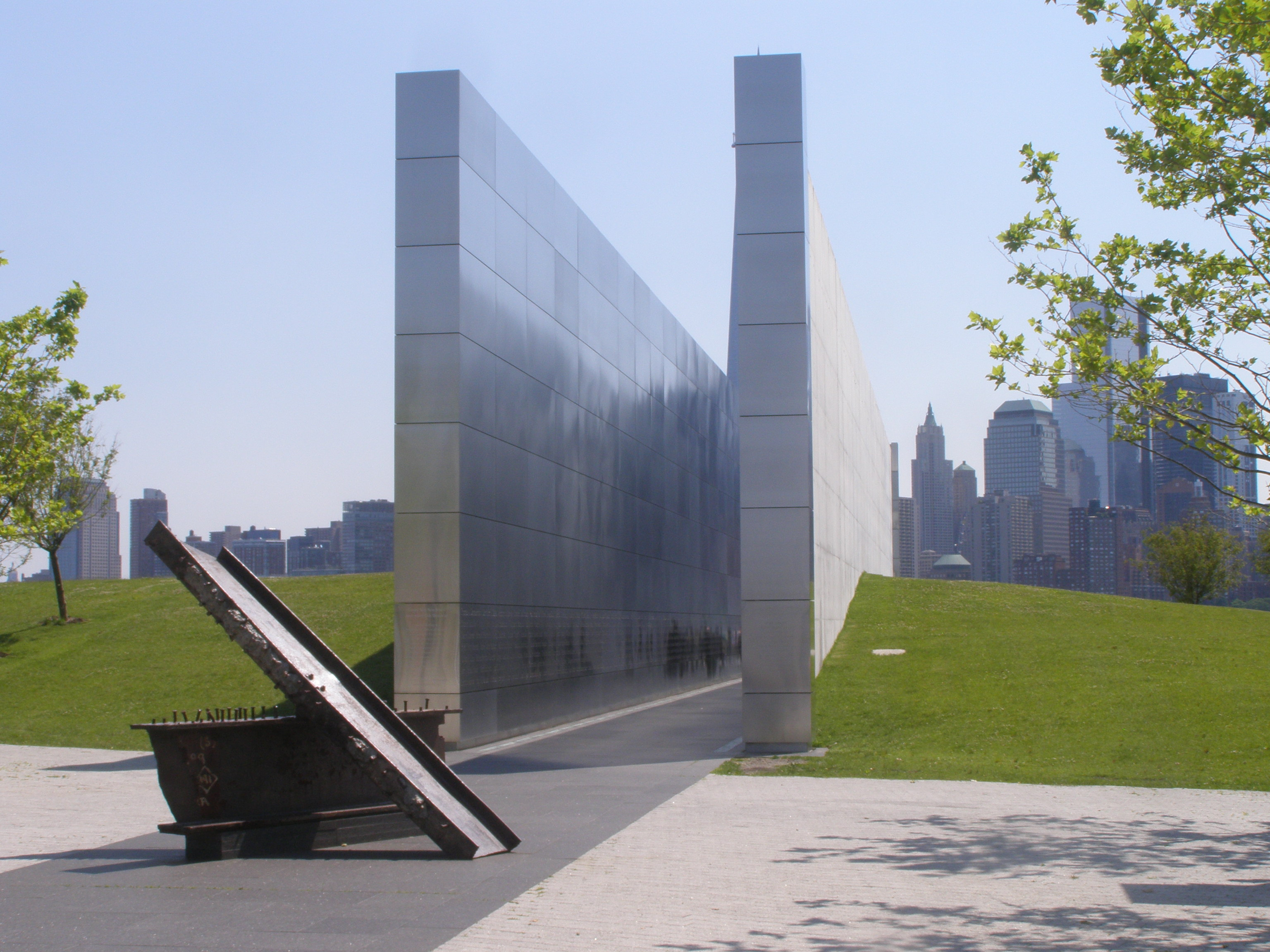
Empty Sky, a memorial with a remnant from the World Trade Center in the foreground

Liberation is a 1985 bronze sculpture designed by Nathan Rapoport as a memorial to the Holocaust, showing a U.S. soldier carrying out a survivor from a Nazi death camp.

La Vela di Colombo is a two-story sail-shaped bronze monument designed by Gino Gianetti that commemorates the 500th anniversary of the westward journey of Christopher Columbus to America in 1492. The "Sail of Columbus" sits atop a stone base in the shape of a ship and features scenes of Columbus and his travels. The gift from Government of Italy and the City of Genoa was dedicated in 1998.

Empty Sky is the official state memorial to the September 11 attacks of the World Trade Center. Situated on a berm the parallel walls engraved with the names of victims are oriented to face the former World Trade Center site. Designed by Jessica Jamroz and Frederic Schwartz, it was dedicated on September 10, 2011, commemorating the tenth anniversary of the attacks.

A temporary monument designed by Zaq Landsberg called Reclining Liberty was displayed adjacent to Empty Sky May 2022 until April 2023. The monument, which shows the Statue of Liberty lying on her side, was previously on display in Harlem's Marcus Garvey Park where it received attention from Time Out and Gothamist. It was inspired by reclining Buddha statues in Asia as its intended meaning is to reconsider the meaning of the United States which, like the Statue of Liberty, is as Landsberg describes "an entity forever upright and tall."

== Liberty State Park Conservation, Recreation, and Community Inclusion Act ==
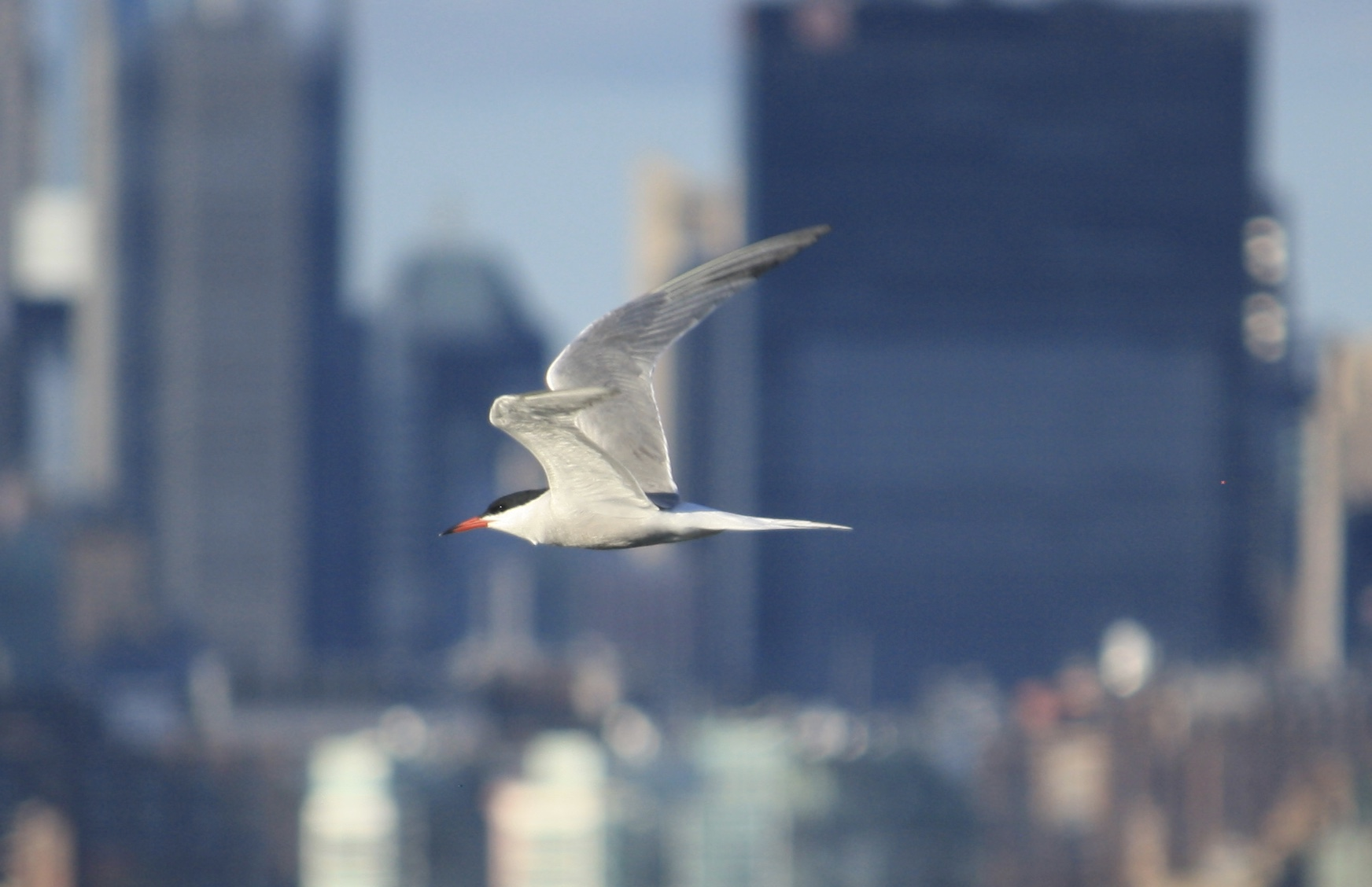
A common tern seen from the park with Manhattan in the background

The administration of Governor Chris Christie proposed various commercial activities for the park. In 2017, it suggested leasing large parts of the waterfront for private marinas.

Caven Point is a 22-acre man-made piece of land and sits adjacent to the Liberty National Golf Course. It is the only sandy beach along the shoreline and home to various migratory birds. Proposals to protect the land have been made in the New Jersey Legislature such as the Liberty State Park Protection Act to specifically protect the park from all development without a severe vetting process and public scrutiny. That proposal has been rejected by both the senate and the assembly for its exclusion of the surrounding community. The Liberty State Park Conservation, Recreation, and Community Inclusion Act was passed in July 2022 with and as a result of the local community feeling it had been left out of the conversation for decades would now be a part of the decision making within this park. The Liberty State Park Conservation, Recreation, and Community Inclusion Act establishes a 17-member Liberty State Park Design Task Force within the New Jersey Department of Environmental Protection (NJDEP) to assist with developing short-term plans to improve public use at the park. In 2023, the Commissioner of the NJDEP, Shawn LaTourette, assured the public that while active recreation facilities will be added to specific areas of the park, they will not be for-profit private facilities.

== Transportation ==
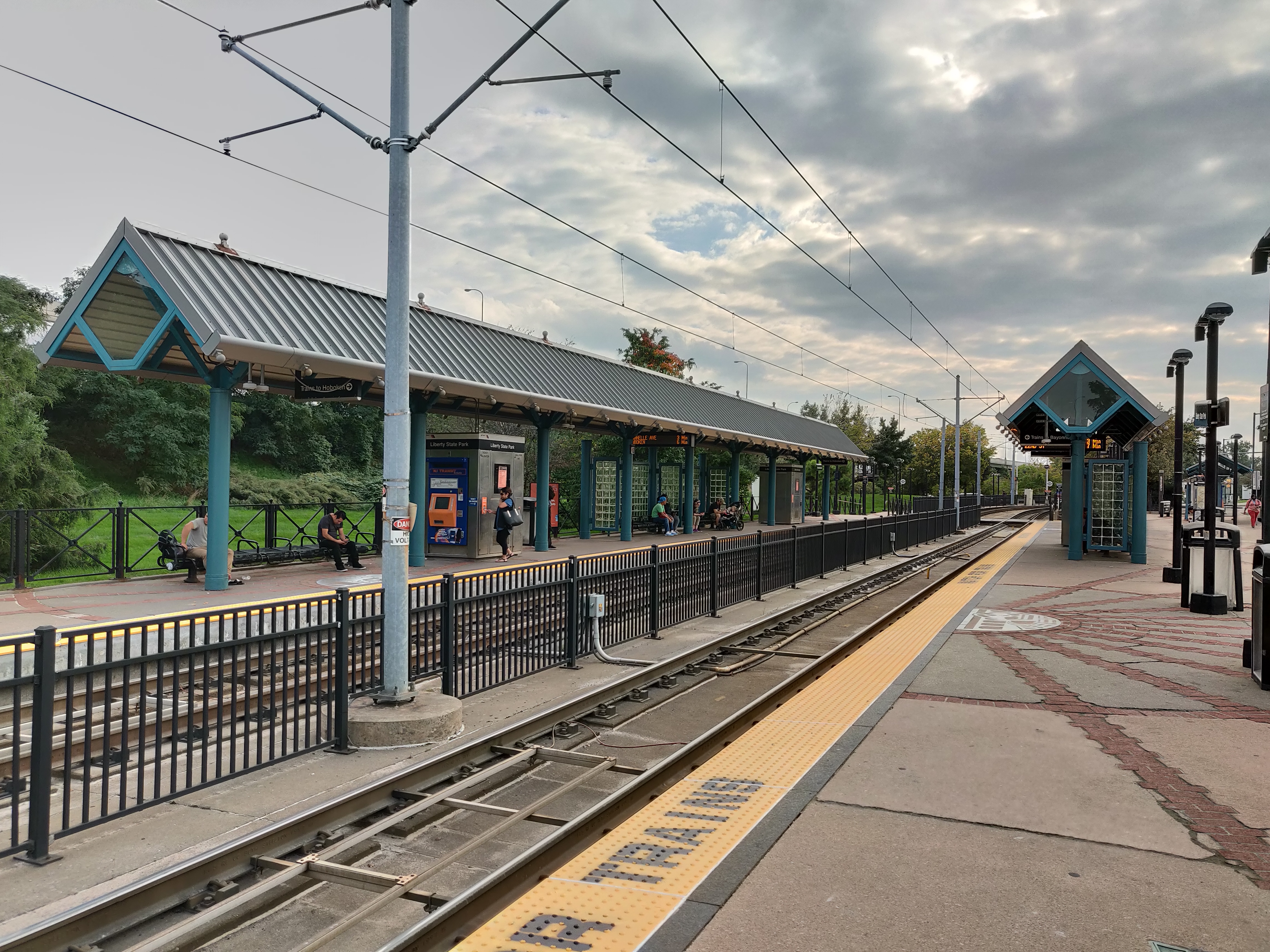
Liberty State Park HBLR Station

NJ Transit's Hudson-Bergen Light Rail runs just to the west of the park. The park is served by the West Side Avenue–Tonnelle Avenue and 8th Street–Hoboken Terminal trains at the Liberty State Park station at the park's western entrance. The park is also served by the 16 NJ Transit Bus route at the station.

The park is served by the Liberty Landing Ferry with service to Liberty Harbor in Downtown Jersey City at Warren Street and Battery Park City in Lower Manhattan. Various harbor cruises also depart from the landing.

Since 2024, a free shuttle bus service, provided by EZ Ride, operates on weekends and holidays from April to November connecting various points of interest within the park to Hudson-Bergen Light Rail and NJ Transit Bus service at Liberty State Park station and ferry service at Liberty Landing. Prior to this service, a pay-to-ride NJ Transit shuttle service operated at the park from 2000 until 2010. In July 2012, NJTPA allotted $175,000 to study transportation alternatives to and within the park.

In May 2013, a new pedestrian bridge, the "Ethel Pesin Liberty Footbridge", named after the late wife of the state park's founder Morris Pesin, was placed over Mill Creek at the Morris Canal Basin to replace an older one that had been destroyed by Superstorm Sandy in October 2012. The new bridge reconnected the northwestern edge of Libery State Park with Downtown Jersey City and was situated so as not interfere with any new road construction.

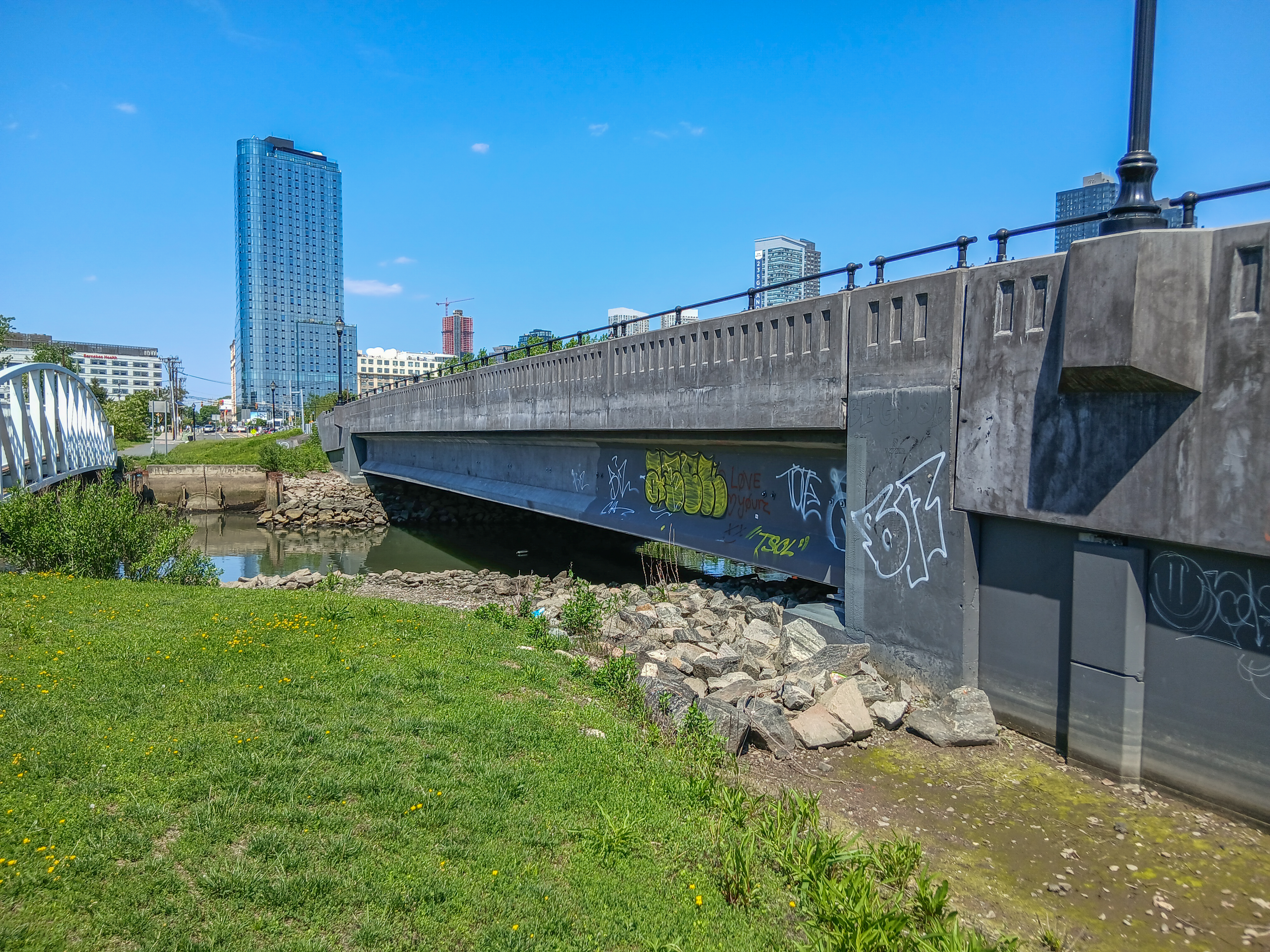
Liberty State Park Bridge over the Morris Canal Basin (opened 2021)

The park is accessible by car via several local roads and the New Jersey Turnpike (I-78) at Exits 14B and 14C. In March 2013, Jersey City received a $500,000 grant to study the extension of Jersey Avenue directly into the park, to simplify access from the Downtown neighborhoods, facilitate through traffic to and from Communipaw, and provide alternatives for Turnpike users to access Downtown Jersey City.

In 2014 NJDOT announced that it would build a $10 million bridge over the Morris Canal Basin, reducing the commute between the park and Downtown Jersey City by more than half a mile. Construction of the connection between Jersey Ave and Phillip Street began in August 2019; the two-lane road with adjoining bike lanes and sidewalks was opened to traffic in August 2021. Since the opening, residents have complained about safety concerns and an increase in traffic congestion due to Holland Tunnel-bound traffic connecting to I-78 through the park. Prior to the bridge, the Mayor Steven Fulop announced the city administration is experimenting with traffic light timing and collaborating with navigation service Waze to reduce congestion.

== In popular culture ==
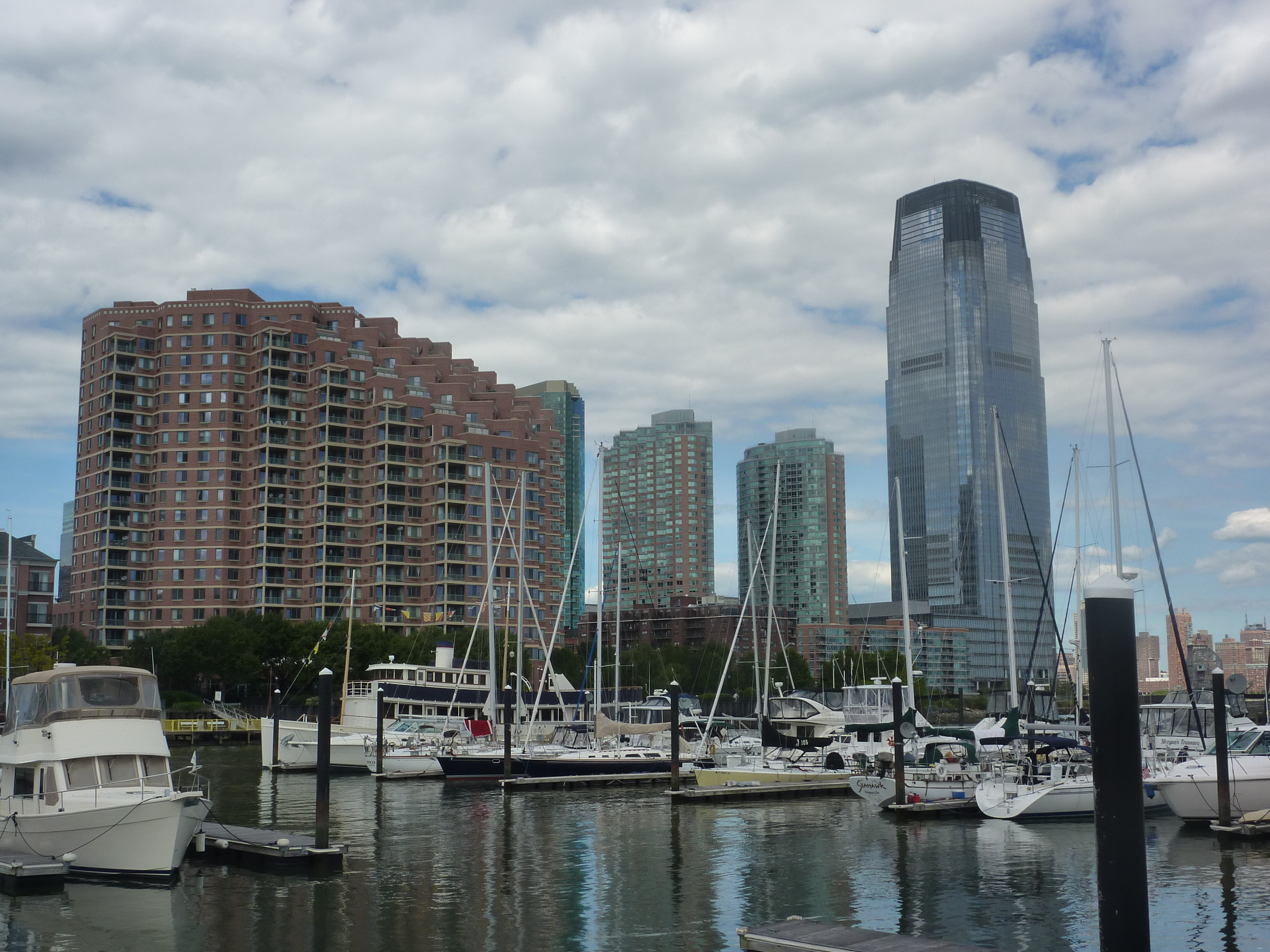
Liberty Harbor

On Labor Day in 1980, Republican Nominee for President Ronald Reagan kicked off his national campaign on Liberty Island, with the Statue of Liberty behind him and said: 'I want more than anything I've ever wanted, to have an administration that will, through its actions, at home and in the international arena, let millions of people know that Miss Liberty still "Lifts her lamp beside the golden door."'

In 2002, Budweiser filmed two commercials to dedicate the September 11 attacks in the park (one in 2002, and another one in 2011). Both were only aired once.

Since 2015, the park has hosted festivities as part of New York City's annual Fleet Week celebration.

=== Festivals and performances ===
- In 1985, Hall & Oates performed a concert at the park on the Fourth of July in front of 60,000 people. The concert was later broadcast on HBO.
- In 2000, Andrea Bocelli gave a concert at the park, broadcast on PBS, as American Dream: Andrea Bocelli's Statue Of Liberty Concert.
- In 2001, Cirque du Soleil premiered its new work.
- In 2008 and 2009, the park hosted the All Points West Music & Arts Festival that featured art installations by Joe Mangrum, stand-up comedy from Arj Barker, Eugene Mirman, Bo Burnham, Tim & Eric, Judah Friedlander, Jim Jefferies, Janeane Garofalo and musical performances from artists such as Radiohead, The New Pornographers, Andrew Bird, Kings of Leon, The Roots, Sia, Jack Johnson, Yeah Yeah Yeahs, Vampire Weekend, Q-Tip, Jay-Z, Gogol Bordello, My Bloody Valentine, Tool, La Roux, The Black Keys and Coldplay.
- In 2012, Aretha Franklin performed at the park for the Fourth Annual Celebrating Life and Liberty event, hosted by the John Theurer Cancer Center at Hackensack University Medical Center.
- In 2013, Cher, Tim McGraw, Miguel, Mariah Carey and Selena Gomez performed at the park for the Macy's 4th of July Fireworks Spectacular.
- Jersey City's Freedom and Fireworks Festival debuted in the park in 2013 Independence Day and included performances from Fireworks by Grucci and the Jersey City-based Kool & the Gang. Since 2017, the festival has been held in the city's Exchange Place neighborhood.
- The Super Bowl XLVIII Kickoff spectacular was held by the Communipaw Terminal in 2014, and featured performances from Goo Goo Dolls, and Daughtry. Erin Andrews, Jordin Sparks, and Joe Buck hosted the event.
- Alicia Keys and Swae Lee performed at the park for the 2021 MTV Video Music Awards
- Since 2023, the park hosts the annual Juneteenth All About Us Festival having featured performances from Musiq Soulchild, Crystal Waters, Robin S., Mario and Jadakiss.
- In 2025, the park hosted Pokémon GO Fest from June 6 to 8 drawing over 500,000 people.

=== Film and television ===
- In 1968, the film Funny Girl shot the "Don't Rain on My Parade" sequence in the CRRNJ Terminal.
- In 1971, the famous The Godfather (1972) scene containing Peter Clemenza and Rocco Lampone's famous exchange, "Leave the gun. Take the cannoli", was filmed at the site before the construction of Liberty State Park.
- In 1997, the film Men in Black depicts a scene where Agent J delivers a newborn alien squid on Morris Pesin Drive.
- The 2006 30 Rock episode The Aftermath was filmed in Liberty Harbor.
- The final scenes of the 2014 adaptation of Annie were shot at Liberty State Park.
- In the 2018 Netflix series Seven Seconds, the bicycle accident at the center of the plot of season 1 occurs at Liberty State Park.
- On Election Day 2020, a live episode of the political program Fox & Friends was filmed in a portable studio next to the CRRNJ Terminal.

=== Sports ===
- Since 2007, the Veuve Clicquot Polo Classic is held every Spring at Liberty State Park.
- In May 2010, plans were put forth outlining the use of the park as the new home of the United States Formula One Grand Prix for the 2012 season. These plans met outrage from the community, particularly the Friends of Liberty State Park, and were ultimately rejected by the New Jersey Department of Environmental Protection.
- On June 19 and 20, 2010, the park hosted the fifth round of the 2010 Red Bull Air Race World Championship.
- Since 2019, the park's Liberty Landing Marina has been the home base for teams competing in the New York leg of the annual Sail GP international sailing competition.
- In 2026, the park was planned to host the FIFA Fan Festival for the New York/New Jersey area as part of the 2026 FIFA World Cup, but this was cancelled.

== Image gallery ==
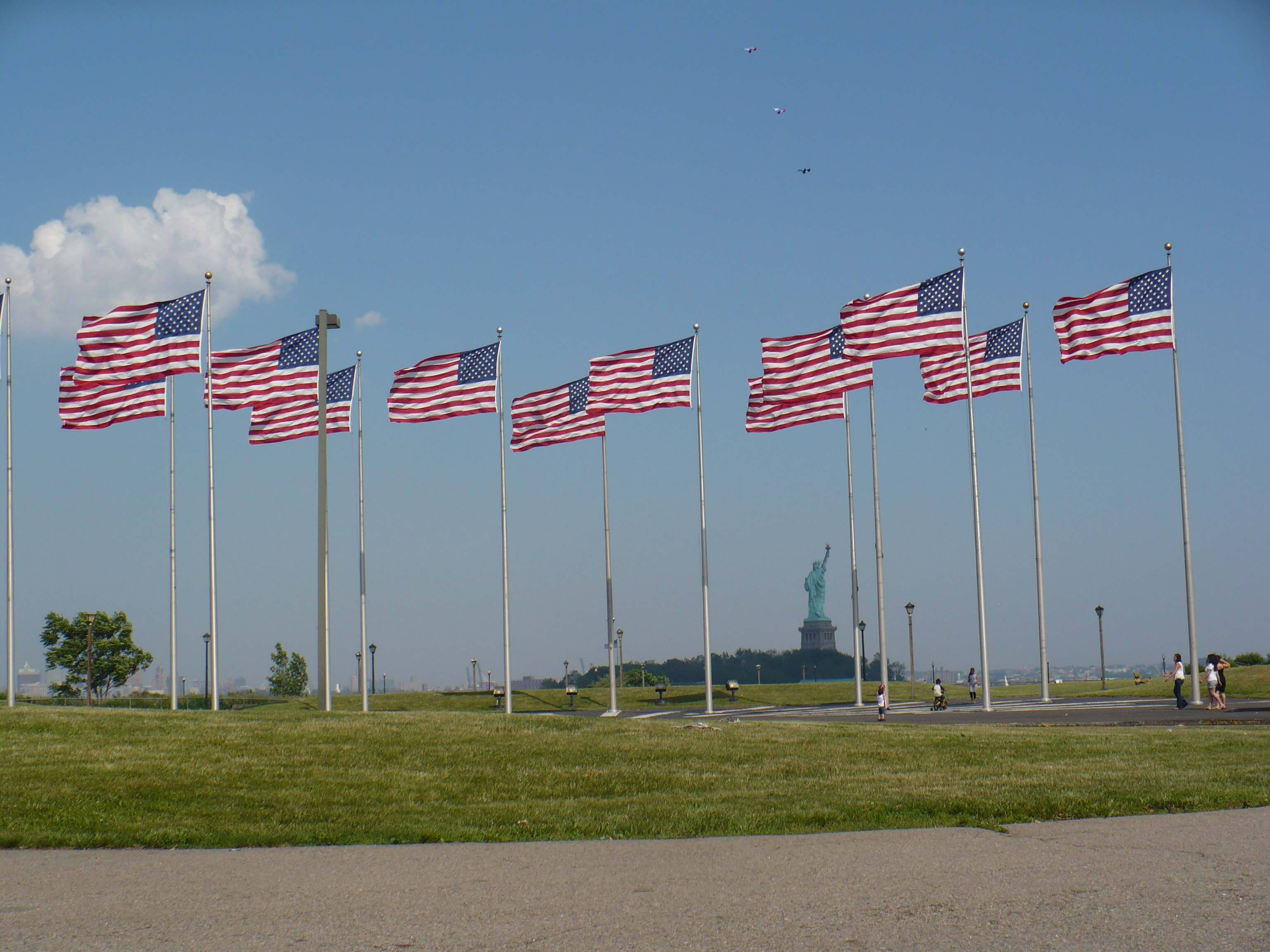
Twelve out of the 13 American Flags displayed at Liberty State Park (one flag not shown), with the Statue of Liberty in the background

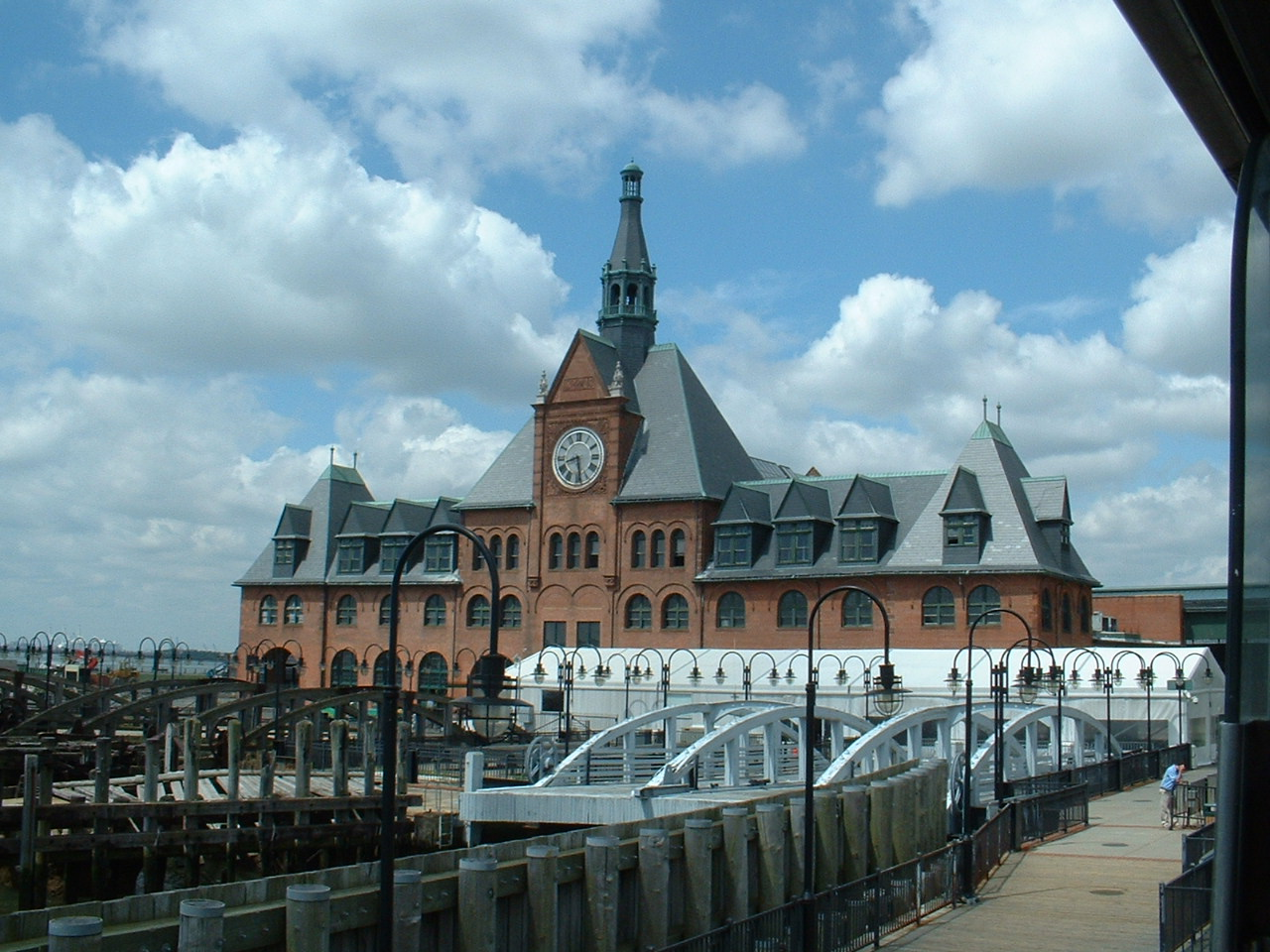
Communipaw Terminal, a historic building, with the dock in foreground provides ferry transport to Ellis Island and Statue of Liberty

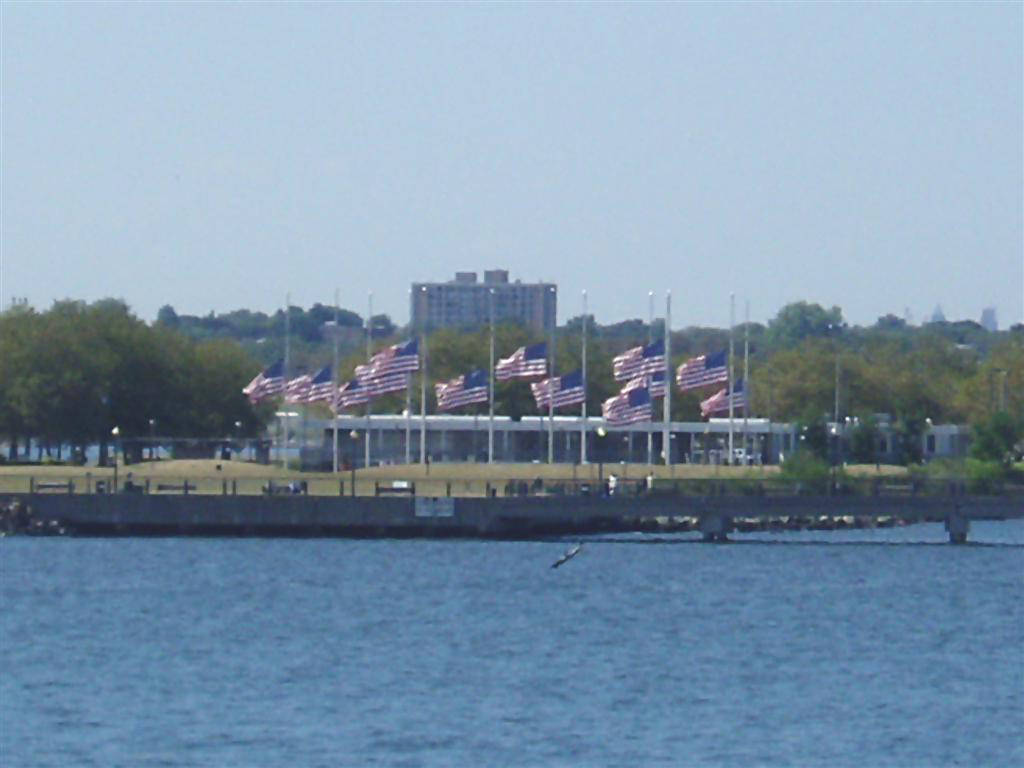
Flags at half-staff at the park

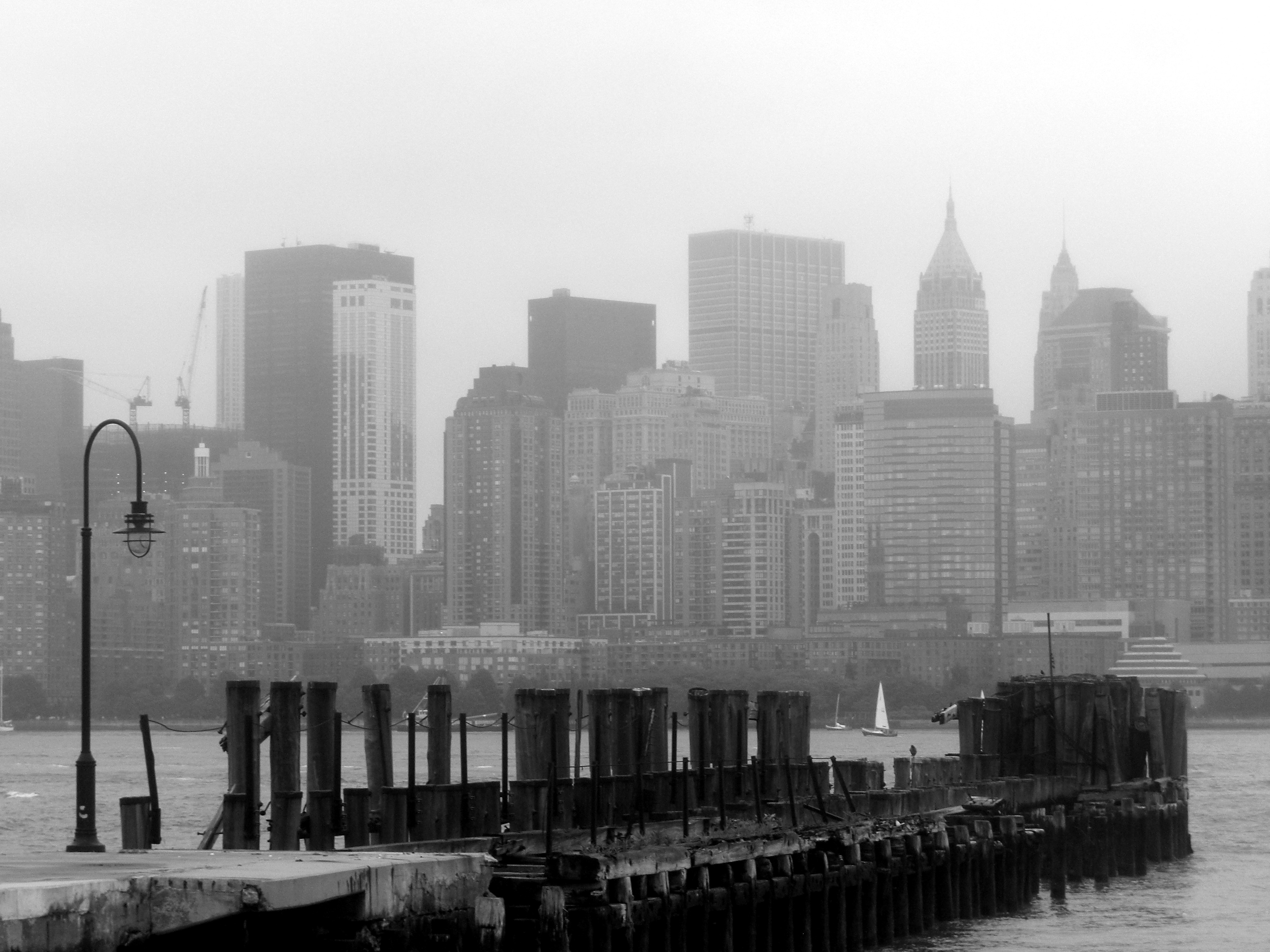
Communipaw Terminal

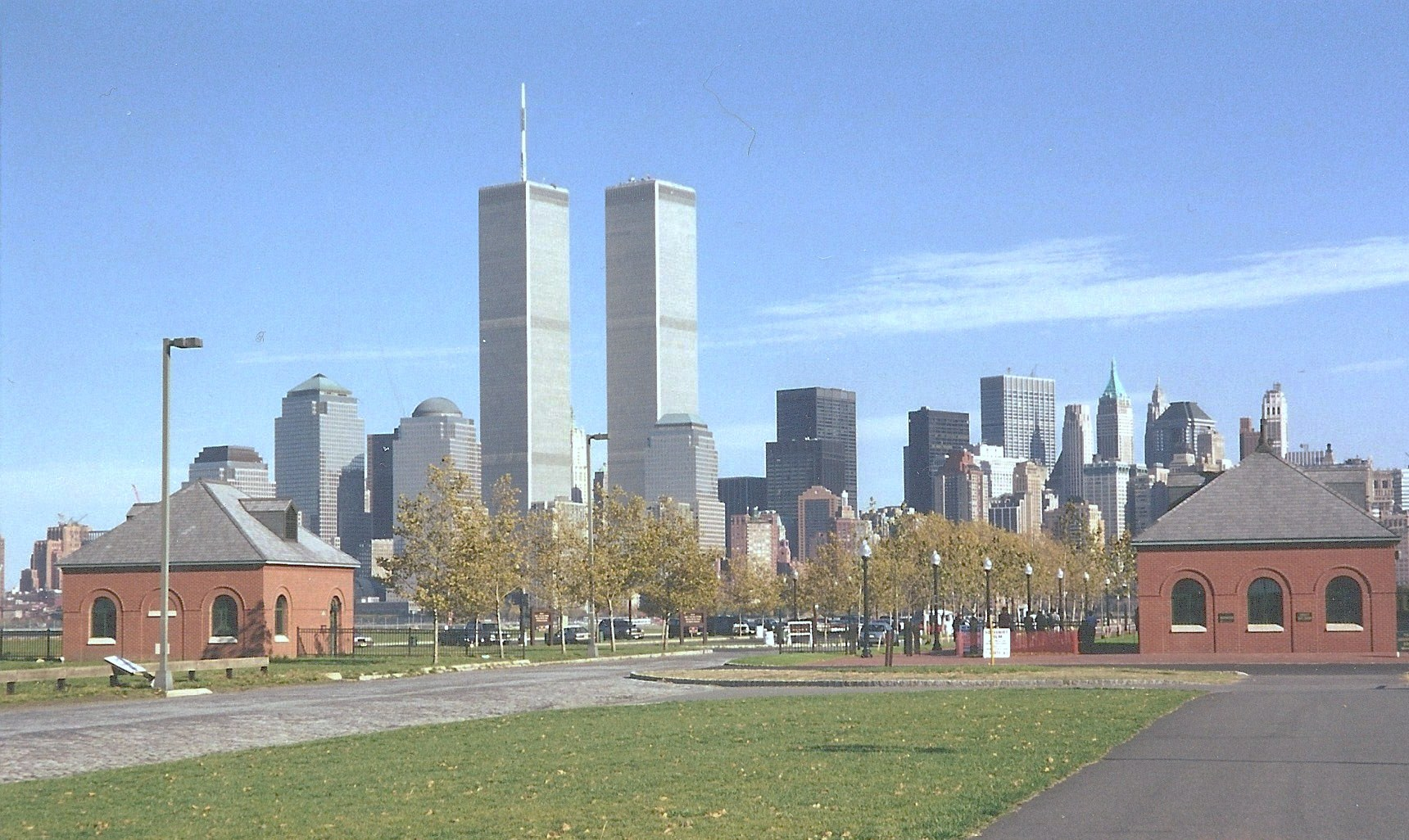
Liberty State Park in 1999

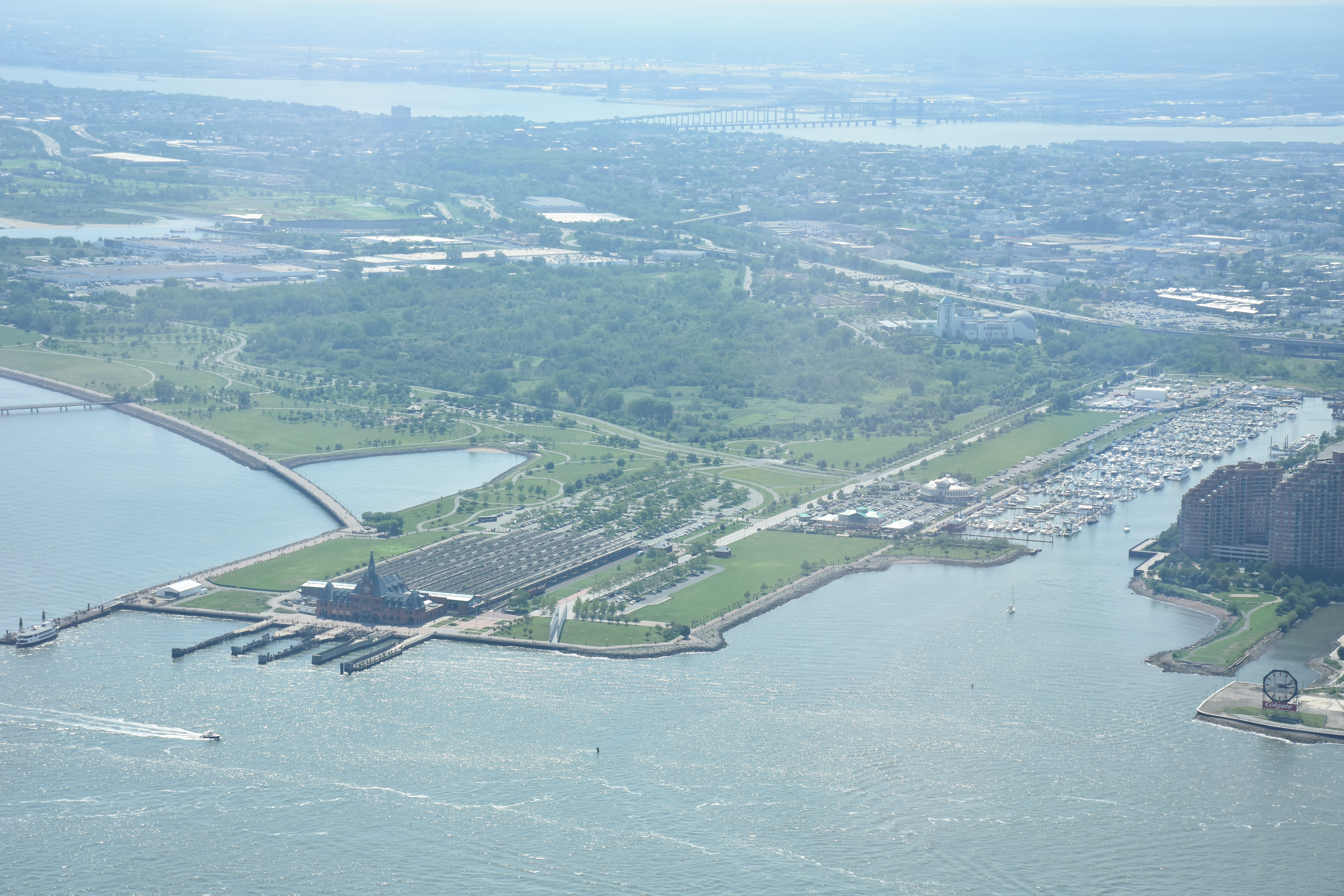
The park as seen from One World Trade Center in June 2015

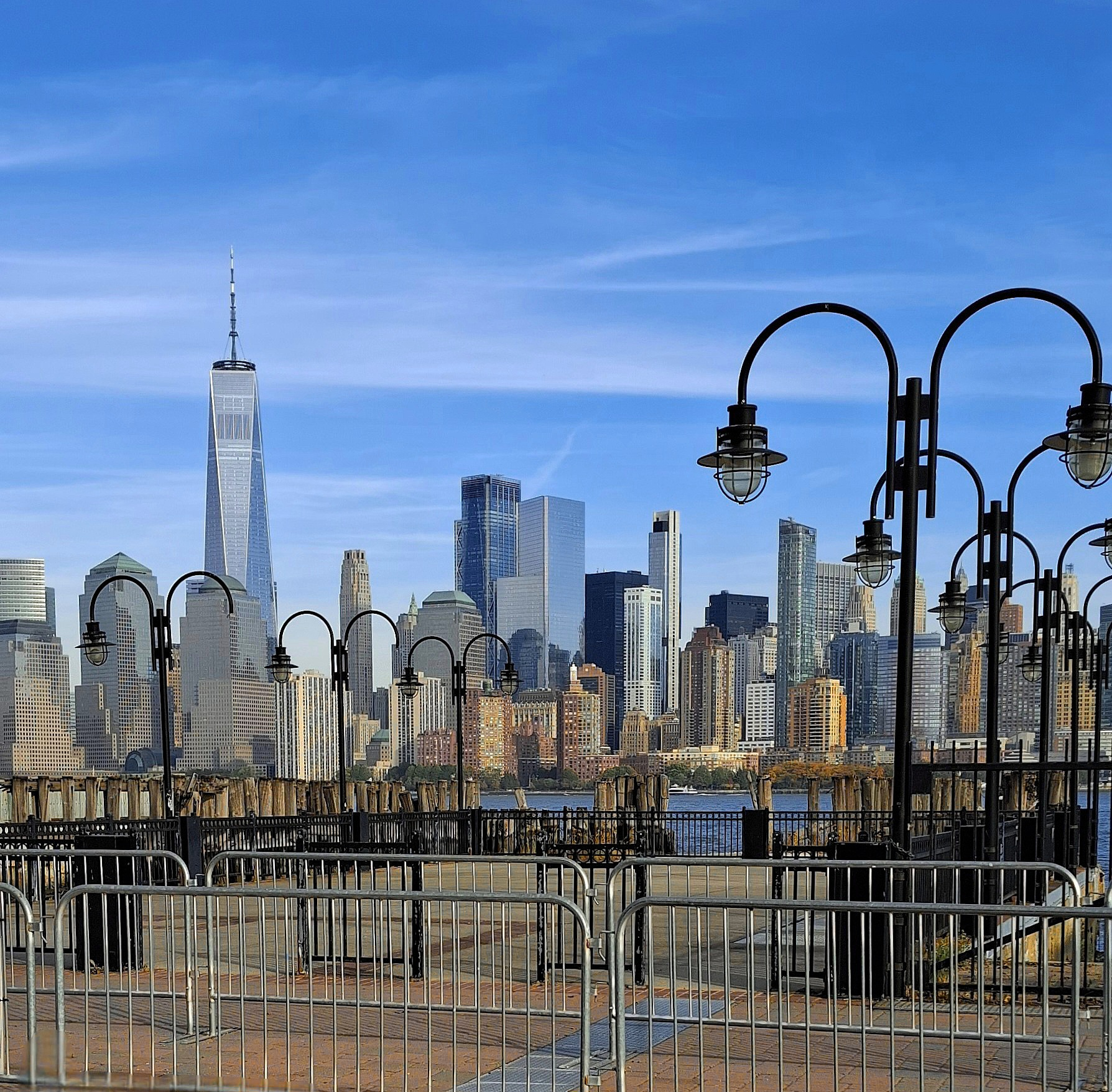
View of Lower Manhattan from the park's waterfront near the old ferry docks in 2024

== See also ==
- List of New Jersey state parks
- Hudson River Waterfront Walkway
- Hudson Parks
- Port of New York and New Jersey
- Marine life of New York-New Jersey Harbor Estuary
