= Edmond 10 =

Studio album by Edmond Leung
- Released: 16 May 2003
- Genre: Cantopop
- Length: 38:14
- Label: EMI, Gold Label

Edmond Leung chronology
Music Is the Answer (2001)	Edmond 10 (2003)	03/Four Seasons (2003)

Edmond 10 (TC: 10號) is a Cantopop album by Edmond Leung, his first released by EMI.

== Track listing ==
1. Zero VS Zero (零比零)
2. One Hour Photo (一小時沖印)
3. Love at Second Sight (二見鍾情)
4. Three Houses for Life (三宅一生)
5. Four-Man Band (披頭四)
6. 501
7. 666
8. Seven Friends (七友)
9. Eight (八)
10. Nine Nine Nine (九九九)
11. Seven Friends (Acapella Version) [七友(群星版)] [Released in 2nd edition]
- Featuring Denise Ho, Miriam Yeung, Candy Lo, Andy Hui, William So, Eddie Ng

== Music awards ==
Year	Ceremony	Award
2003
2003	The Metro Showbiz Hit Awards	Hit Song - Seven Friends(七友)
2003	Commercial Radio Hong Kong Ultimate Song Chart Awards	Ultimate Top 10 Songs [1st] - Seven Friends(七友)
2003	Commercial Radio Hong Kong Ultimate Song Chart Awards	Ultimate Album - Number 10 (10號)
2003	Jade Solid Gold Best Ten Music Awards Presentation	Top 10 Song Awards - Seven Friends(七友)
2003	RTHK Top 10 Gold Songs Awards	Top 10 Songs - Seven Friends(七友)
