= Thinking of You, Waiting for You =

Studio album by Edmond Leung
- Released: 18 January 1991
- Recorded: 1990
- Genre: Cantopop
- Label: Capital Artists

Edmond Leung chronology
Thinking of You, Waiting for You (1991)	Confused Feelings (1993)

Thinking of You, Waiting for You (TC: 想着你等着你) is an album recorded by Edmond Leung and released on 18 January 1991. This is his debut album with Capital Artists.

The Gold Disc Edition was released by East Asia Music on 15 Jul 2011 in order to celebrate Capital Artists 40th Anniversary.

== Track listing ==
1. Thinking of You, Waiting for You (想着你等着你)
2. It's my fault (算我錯了)
3. I'm used to being Unrestrained (我習慣瀟灑)
4. Wrong Lover (錯做情人)
5. Goodbye School Days
6. Can't Forget (不能忘)
7. Sad Love (戀愁)
8. Fascination (著迷)
9. Embankment at Night (長夜堤岸)
10. Still In My Heart (仍留在我心)
