= Holding You Feels So Good =

Studio album by Edmond Leung
- Released: 1995
- Genre: Cantopop
- Label: Capital Artists

Edmond Leung chronology
To Love Someone Else (1995)	Holding You Feels So Good (1995)	Breathe (1996)

Holding You Feels So Good (TC: 抱著你感覺很好) is a Cantopop album by Edmond Leung.

== Track listing ==
1. Love and Affection (愛與情)
2. One Night Only (只得一晚)
3. More or Less (多多少少)
4. Everything Start From Wayward (一切從任性開始)
5. Impatient (心急)
6. Deep Affection and Distraction (情深意亂)
7. Accompany Your Life (陪你一生)
8. Regret (遺憾)
9. I Want To Know (我想知)
10. Three Broken Hearts (傷了三個心)

== Charts ==
Chart (1995)	Peak position
IFPI Hong Kong Group	6
