= Queen's Covers =

EP by Edmond Leung
- Released: 22 Aug 2014
- Genre: Mandopop
- Length: 24:28
- Label: Capital Artists

Edmond Leung chronology
E.d.M.O.N.D (2013)	Queen's Covers (2014)	From There to Here (2015)

Queen's Covers (TC: 聽后感) is a Mandopop album by Edmond Leung, his second studio album in Mandarin.

== Track listing ==
1. Step By Step (一步步)
2. You Exist in My Song (我的歌聲裡)
3. Bravery (勇氣)
4. I'm Not Sad (我不難過)
5. Conquer (征服)
6. Better Halves (半邊生命)

== Music awards ==
Year	Ceremony	Award
2014	IFPI Hong Kong Top Sales Music Award 2014	10 Top Best Sales Releases, Mandarin - Queen's Covers (聽后感)
