= Confused Feelings =

- Gold Disc Edition cover

Studio album by Edmond Leung
- Released: 19 May 1993
- Recorded: February 1993
- Genre: Cantopop
- Label: Capital Artists

Edmond Leung chronology
| Thinking of You, Waiting for You (1991) | Confused Feelings (1993) | Don't Wanna Be Alone (1994) |

Confused Feelings (TC: 糊塗感情) is a Cantopop album by Edmond Leung, which was released by Capital Artists on 19 May 1993.

The Gold Disc Edition was released by East Asia Music on 25 March 2014 in order to celebrate Capital Artists 40th anniversary.

== Track listing ==
1. "Loneliness of Confusion" (instrumental) (糊塗的寂寞)
2. "You Still, I Still" (仍然是妳，仍然是我)
3. "One Night In A Certain Month" (某月某夜)
4. "We're Going Out Tonight"
5. "Love or Not" (不愛還是愛)
6. "Rainy Night" (流離夜雨)
7. "Confused feelings Forever Young" (糊塗感情永不老)
8. "Can You Give Me One More Time?" (可否給我多一次)
9. "Love and Romance" (談情說愛)
10. "Don't Let Love Fade Away" (別放開這點愛戀)
11. "Rainy Night Flower" (流離夜雨...雨中花)
