= Great Fun at All Times =

Studio album by Edmond Leung
- Released: 1 Apr 1999
- Genre: Cantopop
- Label: Capital Artists

Edmond Leung chronology
Edmond 003 - Sparks (1998)	Great Fun at All Times (1999)	Veeeeeeeeery Edmond (1999)

Great Fun at All Times (TC: 隨時行樂) is a Cantopop album by Edmond Leung.

== Track listing ==
1. Great Fun At All Times (隨時行樂)
2. Three Minutes (三分鐘)
3. Star Love Echoes (星情呼應)
4. Hot Air Balloon (熱氣球)
5. Swaggering (大搖大擺)
6. Great Fun At All Times (McDonalds'mix)
7. A Miles of Sunshine (萬里陽光)
8. Investigate (追究)
9. Infinite Universe with Louis Koo(宇宙無限)
10. The Old Testament (舊約)

== Charts ==
Chart (1999)	Peak position
IFPI Hong Kong Group	3
