= Steal Kisses =

Studio album by Edmond Leung
- Released: 1997
- Genre: Cantopop
- Label: Capital Artists

Edmond Leung chronology
| Breathe (1996) | Steal Kisses (1997) | Best Friend (1997) |

Steal Kisses (TC: 偷吻) is a Cantopop album by Edmond Leung.

== Track listing ==
1. Ends of the Earth: West of the Sun (天涯:太陽之西)
2. Angle (角度)
3. The Men in the Closet (衣櫃裡的男人)
4. A Genuine Person (性情中人)
5. My Wish (我的志願)
6. After Love (戀後)
7. Splendid and Fallen (燦爛與墮落)
8. Mistake (破綻)
9. Ends of the Earth: South of the Border (海角:國境之南)
10. Be reluctant to part (依依)

== Charts ==
| Chart (1997) | Peak position |
|---|---|
| IFPI Hong Kong Group | 2 |
