= Music Is the Answer =

Studio album by Edmond Leung
- Released: 28 Aug 2001
- Genre: Cantopop
- Label: Capital Artists

Edmond Leung chronology
Parental Guidance (2000)	Music Is the Answer (2001)	Edmond 10 (2003)

Music Is the Answer is a Cantopop album by Edmond Leung.

== Track listing ==
1. Music Is the Answer (Instrumental Music)
2. Start a new life (重新做人)
3. Do not love (不愛就不愛)
4. Hard (掯)
5. Superhero (超級英雄)
6. Cough out (咳出來)
7. Breathing difficulty(呼吸困難)
8. Fast-rhythm song (快歌)
9. Slow-rhythm song (慢歌)
10. Blow a kiss (飛天吻)
11. Silent film (默片)
12. Special acknowledgement (特別鳴謝)

== Music awards ==
Year	Ceremony	Award
2001	Commercial Radio Hong Kong Ultimate Song Chart Awards	Ultimate Top 10 Songs [5th] - Start a new life (重新做人)
