= The Best (Edmond Leung album) =

Greatest hits album by Edmond Leung
- Released: 3 November 1994
- Recorded: 1992–1994
- Genre: Cantopop
- Label: Capital Artists

Edmond Leung chronology
Don't Wanna Be Alone (1994)	The Best (1994)	To Love Someone Else (1995)

The Best (TC: 壹精選) is the first greatest-hits album by Hong Kong singer Edmond Leung.

== Track listing ==
1. "No.1" (第一位)
2. "Love Once and Forever" (一世一次戀愛)
3. "Miss You All" (想念你的一切)
4. "Thinking of You" (想着你等着你 - 94 unplugged)
5. "100% In Love with You" (一百巴仙愛上你 - 第101次Remix)
6. "Tie Me Up, Tie Me Down" (綑着我困着我 - 縛縛Remix)
7. "Summer No No No" (夏季不不不)
8. "Don't Want to Be Alone" (不願一個人)
9. "Hesitantly" (欲言又止)
10. "One Night In A Certain Month" (某月某夜)
11. "Lingering Games" (纏綿遊戲)
12. "Rainy Night" (流離夜雨...雨中花)
13. "No.1" (remix)

== Charts ==
Chart (1994)	Peak position
IFPI Hong Kong Group	2
