= Effort & Love =

Studio album by Edmond Leung
- Released: 3 Nov 2004
- Genre: Cantopop
- Length: 35:08
- Label: EMI, Gold Label

Edmond Leung chronology
03/Four Seasons (2004)	Effort & Love (2004)	The Story of June (2006)

Effort & Love is a Cantopop album by Edmond Leung.

== Track listing ==
1. Battleship Team (艦隊)
2. 8 Mile Highway (八里公路)
3. The General (大將)
4. Good Friends (夠朋友)
5. The Saddest Thing (最悲哀的事)
6. DJ
7. A Bet's A Bet (願賭服輸)
8. Have A Nice Trip (祝你旅途愉快)
9. 3000 Years Of Flowering (三千年開花)
10. Look For Me (找我)

== Music awards ==
Year	Ceremony	Award
2004
2004	The Metro Showbiz Hit Awards	Hit Song - Battleship Team(艦隊)
2004	Jade Solid Gold Best Ten Music Awards Presentation	Top 10 Song Awards - Battleship Team(艦隊)
