= Frederic Schwartz =

American architect

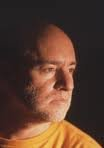
- Born: April 1, 1951; Jamaica, Queens, New York
- Died: April 28, 2014 (aged 63); New York City, New York
- Education: University of California, Berkeley; Harvard
- Occupation: Architect
- Awards: Rome Prize (1985)
- Practice: Frederic Schwartz Architects
- Projects: Staten Island Ferry Whitehall Terminal, New York (2005); The Rising (2006); Empty Sky (2011); Chennai International Airport (scheduled: 2015)

Frederic David Schwartz (April 1, 1951 – April 28, 2014) was an American architect, author, and city planner whose work includes Empty Sky, the New Jersey 9-11 Memorial, which was dedicated in Liberty State Park on September 11, 2011, the tenth anniversary of the September 11 attacks.

A recipient of the prestigious Rome Prize in Architecture, Schwartz -- "for his dedication to using architecture to heal New York"—is included in the New York Hall of Fame, an organization created to "honor remarkable New Yorkers who have contributed to the betterment of the city" and who serve as "role models for children." He was honored by First Lady Laura Bush at the 2003 White House National Design Awards ceremony.

== Biography ==
Schwartz was born in the Jamaica, Queens neighborhood of New York City; he would later design a community center about ten blocks away from the site in South Jamaica, where he was born. He grew up in Plainview, where he watched the construction of new houses, one after the other, in what had been potato fields on the eastern edge of Nassau County—and it was there that he began to build his "first houses," using discarded refrigerator boxes.

A graduate of Berkeley (A.B., Architecture, 1973) and Harvard (Master of Architecture, 1978), he taught architectural design at Harvard, Yale, Penn, Columbia and Princeton, and lectured extensively in America, Europe, China and India. As an undergraduate student he spent his junior year abroad studying at the University of Sussex in Brighton, England in 1971–1972. He is the author of three books on architecture. He was on the advisory board of Creative Cities, a group of architects with a stated mission of "putting culture and community at the heart of urban planning.

Schwartz was the owner and founder of Frederic Schwartz Architects, in New York City. Prior to beginning his own firm, he had worked at Skidmore, Owings & Merrill, and then at Venturi, Rauch & Scott Brown. He regretted that one project on which he worked, a park planned to be located on top of the Hudson River landfill through which the Westway highway was to run, was never created. Without that park, he said, "a whole generation of children lost a place to play."

Schwartz's love for New York drove his decision to locate his firm in SoHo, a neighborhood he "absolutely loves"—and where (in a 2008 interview) he said he could enjoy a view from his window that included the World Trade Center, the Woolworth Building, New York Harbor, the Chrysler Building and the Empire State Building. His office is located in an open studio setting, where he can "teach and nurture," as well as manage. Still drawing with a pen, he has stated that a "good day" for him is one that ends up with "a lot of ink on my hands."

Schwartz was well known as "an activist and a humanist whose architectural career has been dedicated to some of America's (and the world's) most visible waterfront projects." In addition to the $200 million Staten Island Ferry Terminal and Peter Minuit Park, he was the Project Director for Architecture and Planning of the four mile (6 km) long, 100-acre (0.40 km^{2}), $2.6 billion Westway State Park, the San Diego Harbor front Master Plan, the Singapore Harbor Master Plan, and the Master Plan for the Shanghai World Expo 2010 along four miles (6 km) of the Huangpu River." Schwartz's work has won him and his firm numerous national and international awards and design competitions, including the prestigious Rome Prize in Architecture.

Schwartz's efforts in many areas are based on the goal of "green" affordable housing, including his work with the Housing Authority of Ghana on a joint public-private initiative to address the nation's affordable housing shortage through the design of modular pre-fabricated "green" housing for ten new towns with populations of approximately 20,000 residents each.

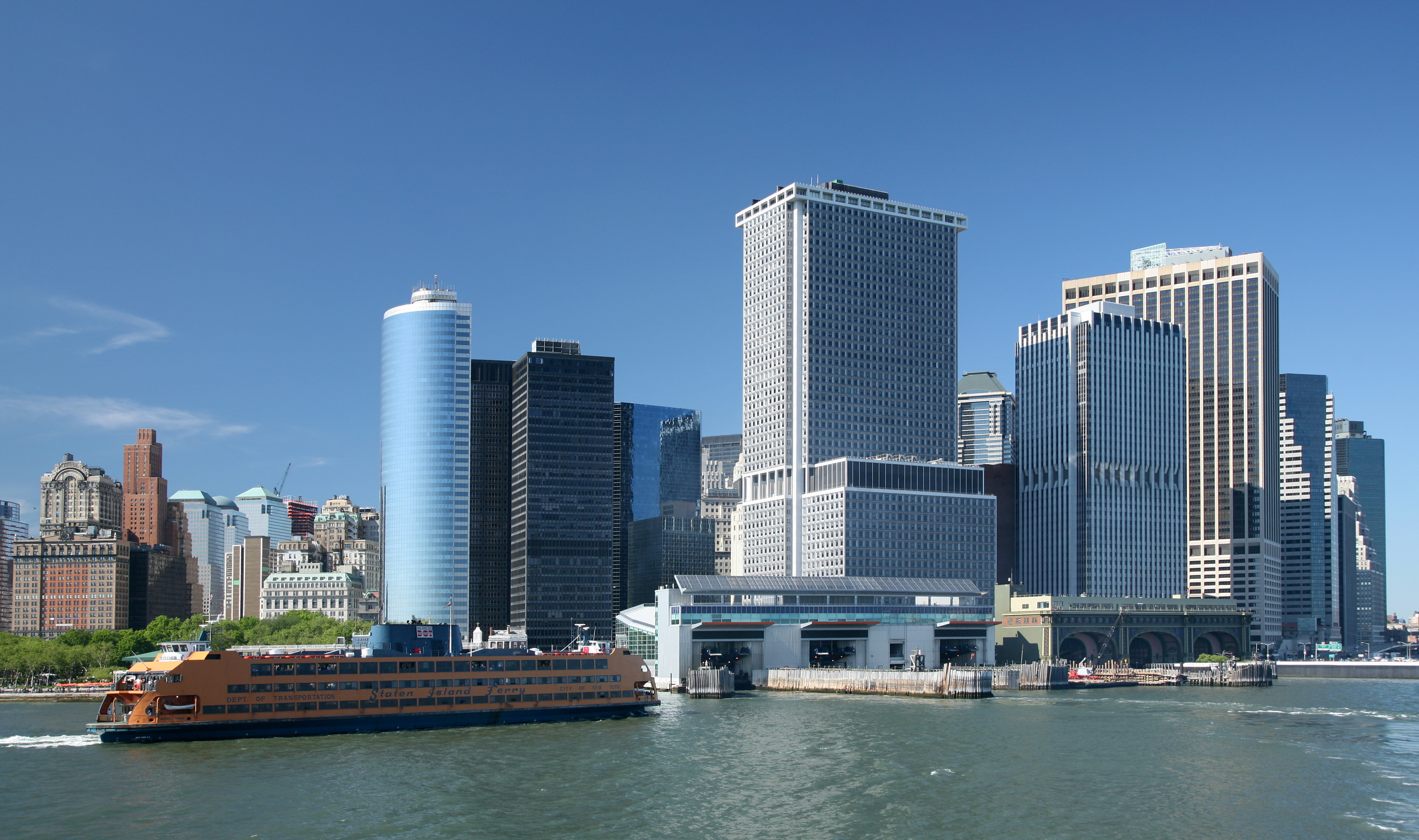
The Staten Island Ferry Whitehall Terminal, Lower Manhattan

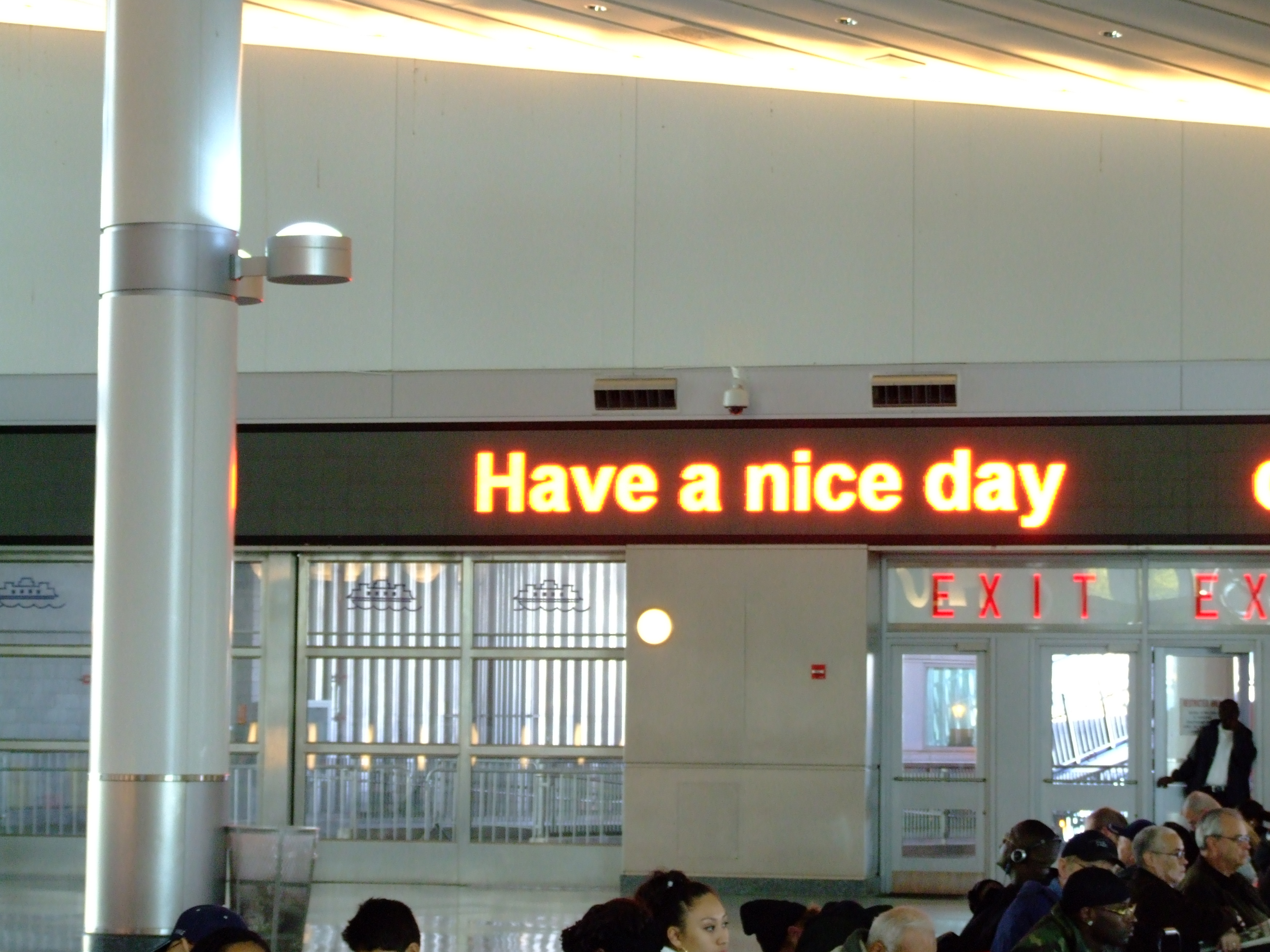
The message board at the Whitehall Terminal, showing the message, "Have a nice day."

After the September 11 attacks on the World Trade Center, he founded the internationally renowned THINK Team, an international group of architects selected to master plan and re-imagine Ground Zero, that was runner-up for Innovative Master Planning at the World Trade Center. In a report on this initiative, The New York Times described Schwartz as: "The Man Who Dared the City to THINK Again," and used his ideas as the framework for its "Think Big" Planning Study on the first anniversary of 9/11.

In 2010, Schwartz appeared in the documentary Saving Lieb House, the story of the efforts of world-renowned architects Robert Venturi and Denise Scott Brown to save the house (called "an iconic pop-art creation" and a "masterpiece of abstract modern design") from its scheduled demolition." The twenty-five-minute film recounts how the home, built in the late 60s, was first slated for demolition by a developer who wanted to clear the area for new construction, but was ultimately saved by the dedication of a small group that was able to move it on a two-day journey by barge from Loveladies, New Jersey, to Long Island, New York.

=== Staten Island Ferry Whitehall Terminal ===
In New York, Schwartz was the architect for the completely renovated Staten Island Ferry Whitehall Terminal, which included the new two-acre Peter Minuit Plaza in Lower Manhattan. The terminal accommodates over 100,000 tourists and commuters on a daily basis (for transportation open 24 hours a day), and the new design establishes the terminal as a major integrated transportation hub, connecting it with a new South Ferry subway station with access to four subway lines, three bus lines and taxis. Additionally, through the Terminal and Minuit Plaza, access to bicycle lanes and even other water transport options are also available.

A "gateway to the city," set against the backdrop of Manhattan's greatest buildings on one side and the river on the other, the design was created to imbue the terminal "with a strong sense of civic presence." In his remarks at the terminal's February 7, 2005, dedication, Mayor Michael Bloomberg stated that "You can walk into this spectacular terminal day or night and feel like you're part of the city ... (the terminal) is a continuation of what you feel on the ferry ... in a sense you are suspended over the water." Described as "an elegant addition to [the] city's architecture," a 2005 Newsday writer called it a transit hub that is so beautiful that it has become a "destination": with "the panorama of lower Manhattan from the top of the escalators, the vast windows framing the Statue of Liberty, the upstairs deck with views of the harbor -- these are reasons to take shelter here for a little longer than the ferry schedule makes strictly necessary."

=== Post-Katrina New Orleans ===
An architect and planner with particular expertise in affordable, sustainable housing, Schwartz was selected by the citizens of New Orleans and the New Orleans City Planning Commission to re-plan one third of the city for 40% of its post-Katrina population. He was determined to use the opportunity for rebuilding the city as a chance to strengthen social justice and community life, writing that:

The planning of cities in the face of disaster (natural and political) must reach beyond the band-aid of short-term recovery. Disaster offers a unique opportunity to rethink the planning and politics of our metro-regional areas -- it is a chance to redefine our cities and to reassert values of environmental care and social justice, of community building and especially of helping the poor with programs for quality, affordable, and sustainable housing.

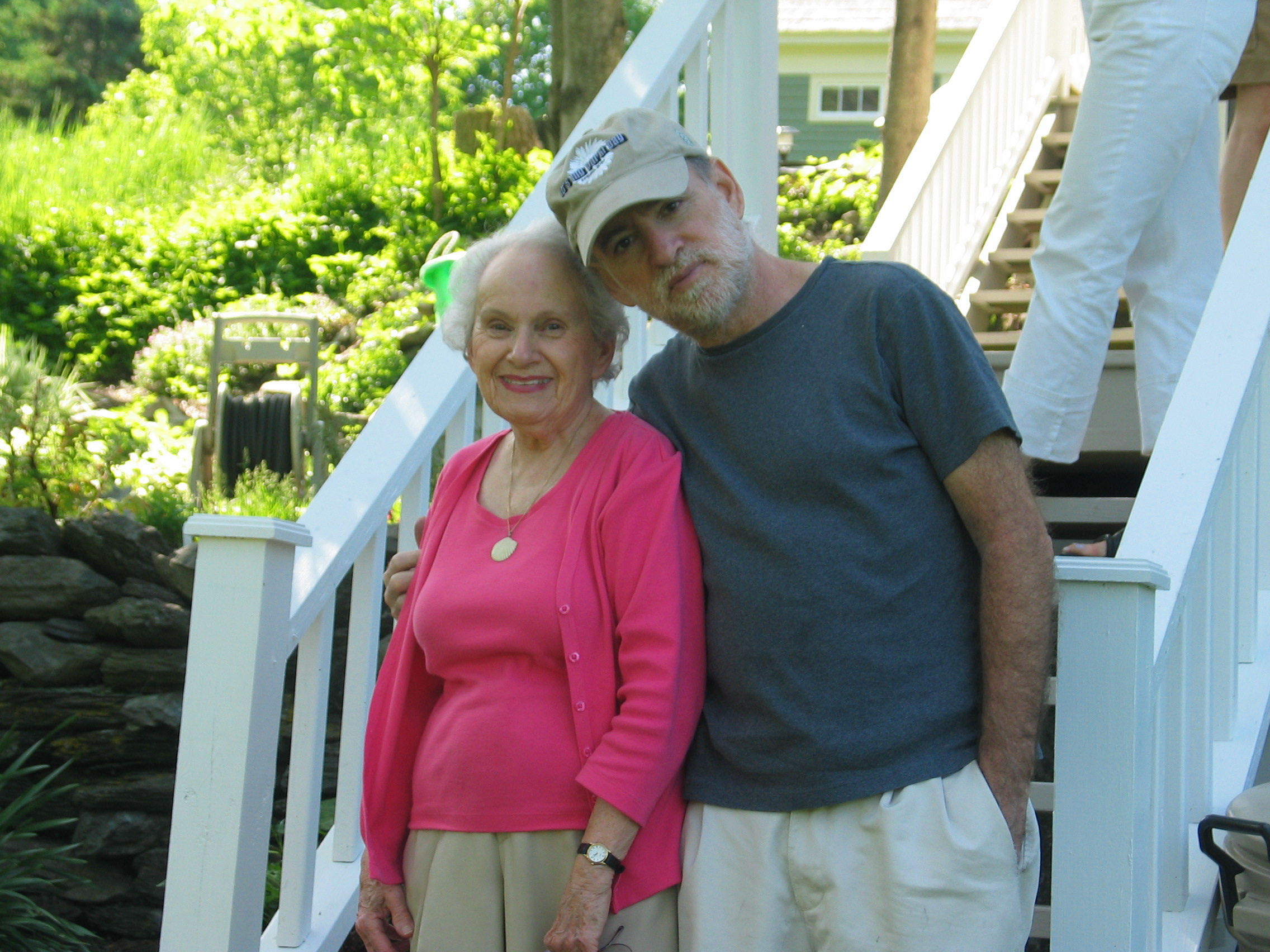
Relaxing with his mother, Charlotte Schwartz, May 2006.

Schwartz and his team became the lead planners for District 4, the district that includes the "largest concentration of public housing in the city" (Iberville, St. Bernard, Lafitte and B. W. Cooper), and according to Schwartz he "made every effort to involve the residents and the community in the planning effort," while ensuring that the design of the new housing "could maintain the look and feel of surrounding neighborhoods with a mix of both modern interpretation of historic typologies and new urbanist models."

Schwartz called much of his work a "Robin Hood practice," taking profits from some of his more profitable work so that he could work on the projects he feels can really "help people." He credits much of his dedication to charitable work to his parents, who taught him, he says, "the lessons of giving and working hard." In a 2008 interview he stated that "My mother is 85 years old and she drives a half hour to read to someone who is blind. She is still helping people, and to me that is heroic."

=== September 11 memorials ===
As a Manhattan resident present in the city the day of the September 11 attacks on the World Trade Center, Schwartz was deeply affected by the tragedy. "I live ten blocks from the Trade Center ... I saw it. I heard it," he said. He was convinced that architecture could be one way to help heal the city, and the survivors, in the aftermath of those attacks.

Schwartz recounted that as he "had to cope with the absence of the towers day after day from his desk," he did what he could to create a discussion about larger issues and "fundamental questions": at such "important junctures in history," "how do architects act as caretakers during times of chaos, crisis, exodus, and change? Why and who do we rebuild for?"

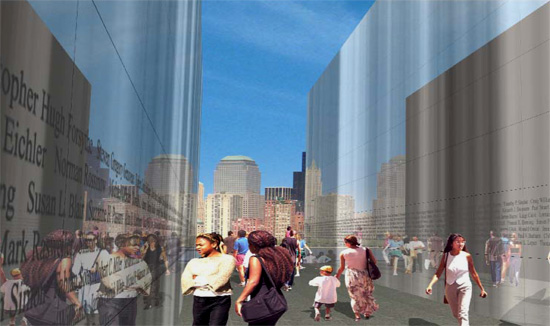
Artist's rendering of visitors at Empty Sky, Liberty State Park, NJ, New Jersey State 9-11 memorial

Schwartz and the "THINK Team" that he created to help create a public debate that went beyond the confines of the memorial to the larger question of a new Lower Manhattan, ultimately did complete the design for the Manhattan 9-11 memorial that was chosen by the Memorial Commission, but the commission's recommendation was overruled by then-governor George Pataki, who chose another firm for the job.

The design created by Schwartz and his team was based on the idea of replacing the World Trade Center with a "World Culture Center," in the form of a vertical complex of educational and cultural buildings, including a concert hall, conference center, library, and an "interpretive museum" focused on the events of September 11. The design included two steel lattice frameworks that would stand in the same approximate locations as the original towers, but not touch the original "footprints" of the old towers in a show of respect for the "sacral dimension" of the site.

Although this was not the design ultimately chosen, the concept received a good deal of praise, including this description in a New York Times "Design Review" article:

Think has created a schoolhouse: an open, flexible framework to support the pursuit of ideas. The framework itself is an eloquent statement of the values that should guide that pursuit. We are an open, modern, enlightened, humanistic democracy, these soaring structures announce. And we can do even better than retaliate against attack by enemies. Each time we look up at the sky, we can remember that our values are more resilient than theirs.

However, after narrowly missing his chance to create the Manhattan memorial, Schwartz did go on to win the international competitions for two other 9/11 memorials, in New Jersey State and Westchester County, New York.

The Westchester memorial, The Rising, was awarded the 2007 Faith and Form Sacred Landscape Award. The Interfaith Journal on Religion, Art, and Architecture describes the memorial as one that "invites families and visitors to look back in memory of their loved ones and look forward as a community," providing "a place for prayer and reflection."

The New Jersey State September 11 memorial, Empty Sky, was dedicated on September 11, 2011, the tenth anniversary of the attacks. It stands in Liberty State Park, along the Hudson River, across from the site of Ground Zero. It was selected by unanimous vote of the Family and Survivors Memorial Committee, from 320 designs submitted.

=== Chennai International Airport ===
One example of Schwartz's international projects is the Chennai International Airport (previously called Madras International Airport), Chennai, India. Teaming up with Gensler USA and the Creative Group in India, Schwartz's group is working on a project that will include new domestic and international terminals, two 1200 car parking garages, and new airport roads. The airport will be unique because of the incorporation of two lush and sustainable gardens, visible through towering glass walls throughout the terminals, creating a "dialogue" between the exterior and interior spaces. The project will allow rain water to be delivered through the design of the terminal's hovering 300 meter-long wing-like roofs (which fold downward to form the walls of the gardens) to a series of cisterns and tunnels, where it will be stored for use as irrigation during the dry season. The "sculptural" folding green roof of the new parking garage along with the views of the garden will welcome travelers with a "green gateway" in both rainy and dry seasons.

The airport is currently the third busiest airport in India, after Mumbai and Delhi, with more than 25 different operating airlines using the facility, and is also the second largest cargo hub in India, after Mumbai. With the $750 million renovation and expansion, the goal is to increase annual passenger capacity from 10 million to 30 million. Upon completion, Chennai will be India's "greenest airport" because of its sustainable technology, and the most modern airport in all of South Asia.

=== Death ===
Schwartz died of prostate cancer on April 28, 2014, less than a month after his 63rd birthday, in Manhattan, New York.

== Projects ==
- Raipur Airport, Raipur, India (2007–2008)
- The Rising (9-11 memorial)
- Empty Sky (9-11 memorial)
- Pike County Library, Milford, PA (2007–2008)
- Kalahari Mixed Use Development, New York, NY (2003–2008)
- Nike SoHo, New York, NY (2007–2008)
- Santa Fe Railyard Park, Santa Fe, NM (2006)
- Deutsch Inc., New York, NY (1992–2005)
- Knoll, New York, NY (2004)
- Deutsch Inc., Los Angeles, CA (2002)
- Southwest Regional Capitol, Toulouse, France (1992–1999)
- John G. Shedd Aquarium, Go Overboard Shop, Chicago, IL (1998)

== Awards ==
Schwartz was the winner of international competitions for a one million square foot skyscraper in the heart of Shanghai, China.

=== American Institute of Architects (AIA) Awards ===
Among Schwartz's many awards are the following from AIA:

- 2009 AIA New York State Award, Staten Island Ferry Terminal, New York, NY
- 2009 AIA New York/Boston Urban Design Honor Award, Santa Fe Railyard Park, NM
- 2008 AIA Louisiana Urban Design Honor Award, Unified New Orleans Plan, New Orleans, LA
- 2008 AIA New York Urban Design Award, Unified New Orleans Plan, New Orleans, LA
- 2007 AIA Louisiana Project Award, New Orleans Shotgun Loft House, New Orleans, LA
- 2006 AIA New York Project Award, New Orleans Shotgun Loft House, New Orleans, LA
- 2005 AIA Westchester Honor Award, Westchester 9/11 Memorial, Westchester, NY
- 2005 AIA Westchester Project Award, Westchester 9/11 Memorial, Westchester, NY
- 2005 AIA Tennessee Award of Excellence, Nashville, TN (Shelby Street Bridge)
- 2004 AIA New York Project Award, World Trade Center Master Plan, New York, NY (Think)
- 2004 AIA New Jersey Honor Award, New Jersey 9/11 Memorial, Liberty State Park, NJ
- 2003 AIA National Honor Award for Collaborative Achievement (New York New Visions)
- 2003 AIA Long Island Design Excellence Award, Deutsch LA, Los Angeles, CA
- 2003 AIA New York Interior Design Award, Deutsch LA, Los Angeles, CA
- 2003 AIA Chicago Interior Design Award, San Diego Zoo Store, San Diego, CA
- 2002 AIA New York Special Design Award, Possible Futures, New York, NY
- 2002 AIA San Diego Interior Design Award, San Diego Zoo Store, San Diego, CA
- 1999 AIA Chicago Interior Design Award, Shedd Aquarium Store, Chicago, IL
- 1996 AIA New York Interior Design Award, Bumble+Bumble, New York, NY
- 1995 AIA New York Interior Design Award, SMA Video, New York, NY
- 1995 AIA New York Project Award, New York Newsstand, New York, NY
- 1994 AIA New York Project Award, Lake Sebago House, Maine
- 1993 AIA New York Interior Design Award, Chelsea Pictures, New York, NY
- 1982 AIA National Honor Award, Block Island Houses, Block Island, RI (with Robert Venturi)

=== Selected other awards ===
Non-AIA awards include:

- 2008 New York City Hall of Fame
- 2007 National Honor Award, Interfaith Forum on Religion, Art, Architecture (Westchester 9/11)
- 2006 Diamond Award for Engineering Excellence, ACEC New York, (Staten Island Ferry Terminal)
- 2005 Winner, People's Choice Award, New York NOW, Center for Architecture, New York, NY
- 2004 Winner, Cityscape/Architectural Review Architecture Award 2004 (Shanghai World Expo 2010)
- 2004 Winner, Cityscape/Architectural Review Planning Award 2004 (Shanghai World Expo 2010)
- 2004 International Interior Design Association, 10 Best of Decade Design Award (Deutsch LA)
- 2003 Finalist, National Honor Award in Architecture, Smithsonian Institution, Washington, DC
- 2003 Lawrence M. Orton Award, New York Metro Chapter, American Planning Association
- 2002 First Prize (Big Store of the Year), National Retail Association, San Diego Zoo Store
- 1992 Met 100: Architects We'd Hire, Metropolitan Home
- 1991 Record Interiors of the Year, Architectural Record
- 1991 AD 100: Architectural Digest World Top 100 Architects
- 1990 Record Houses of the Year, Architectural Record
- 1988 Emerging Voices, Architectural League of New York
- 1988 New York City Arts Commission Award of Honor, Rector Gate
- 1987 40 Under 40, Interiors Magazine
- 1985 Young Architects Award, Architectural League of New York
- 1985 Rome Prize in Architecture, American Academy in Rome, Rome, Italy
- 1984 Young Architects Award, Architectural League of New York
- 1983 National Endowment for the Arts Design Fellowship

== Published works ==
- Introduction, Alan Buchsbaum: Architect and Designer, by Rosalind Kraus, Monacelli Publishes, 1996, ISBN 978-1-885254-39-9
- Mother's House (co-authored with Robert Venturi), Rizzoli Publishers, 1992, published in English, Japanese, and German, ISBN 978-0-8478-1141-0
