= Love & Peace (Edmond Leung EP) =

EP by Edmond Leung
- Released: 29 Aug 2009
- Genre: Cantopop
- Length: 27:01
- Label: Gold Typhoon

Edmond Leung chronology
The Story of June (2006)	Love & Peace (2009)	#20 (2011)

Love & Peace is a Cantopop album by Edmond Leung.

== Track listing ==
1. Homemade Instant Noodles (住家丁麵)
2. Joyful (痛快)
3. First Lady (第一夫人)
4. External Stuff (身外物)
5. Impatient (躁)
6. Requiem (安魂戰曲)
7. The Best Love (最愛)

== Music awards ==
Year	Ceremony	Award
2009	The Metro Showbiz Hit Awards	Hit Song – Homemade Instant Noodles (住家丁麵); Hit Karaoke Song – Homemade Instant Noodles (住家丁麵)
