= Breathe (Edmond Leung album) =

Studio album by Edmond Leung
- Released: 1996
- Genre: Cantopop
- Label: Capital Artists

Edmond Leung chronology
Holding You Feels So Good (1995)	Breathe (1996)	Steal Kisses (1997)

Breathe (TC: 呼吸) is a Cantopop album by Edmond Leung.

== Track listing ==
1. Breathe (呼吸)
2. Can or Can't (可不可不可以)
3. Dear (親愛的)
4. Lovelorn Ten Thousand Times (失戀一萬次)
5. Punish Me (懲罰我)
6. Three Broken Hearts (傷了三個心)
7. Love and Affection (愛與情)
8. All I Need Is Love (我需要的只是愛)
9. I Want To Fly (我要先飛)
10. I Am Wrong (我錯)
11. Fight For Tomorrow (為明日爭氣)
12. Color, Aroma and Taste (濃情色香味)

== Charts ==
Chart (1996)	Peak position
IFPI Hong Kong Group	1

== Music awards ==
Year	Ceremony	Award
1996	Jade Solid Gold Best Ten Music Awards Presentation	Top 10 Song Awards - Breathe (呼吸)
