= Parental Guidance (album) =

Studio album by Edmond Leung
- Released: 1 October 2000
- Genre: Cantopop
- Label: Capital Artists

Edmond Leung chronology
The Butterfly Has Come to This World (2000)	Parental Guidance (2000)	Music Is the Answer (2001)

Parental Guidance (TC: PG家長指引) is a Cantopop album by Edmond Leung.

== Track listing ==
1. Parental Guidance (PG家長指引)
2. Mysteries In The World (瀛寰搜奇)
3. Anniversary (週年紀念)
4. Once Is Enough (一次就夠)
5. My Destiny (我的命運)
6. A Date With You (約你)
7. Someone Miss You (有個人很想你)
8. Look At Me (看我)
9. Bird (鳥)
10. Kitaro (喜多郎)
11. My Destiny (Remix)
12. Look At Me (Piano Version)

== Music awards ==
Year	Ceremony	Award
2000	Commercial Radio Hong Kong Ultimate Song Chart Awards	Ultimate Top 10 Songs [9th] - Parental Guidance (PG家長指引)
