= From There to Here (Edmond Leung EP) =

EP by Edmond Leung
- Released: 4 August 2015
- Genre: Cantopop
- Label: Capital Artists

Edmond Leung chronology
Queen's Covers (2014)	From There to Here (2015)

From There to Here (TC: 一路走來) is a Cantopop EP by Edmond Leung.

== Track listing ==
1. "From There To Here" (一路走來)
2. "The Leading Role" (主角一號)
3. "Broke Up For A While" (暫時分開)
4. "Back To The Origin" (回到當初)

== Charts ==
Chart (2015)	Peak position
CD Warehouse	4
