= Best Friend (Edmond Leung album) =

Studio album by Edmond Leung
- Released: 1997
- Genre: Cantopop
- Label: Capital Artists

Edmond Leung chronology
Steal Kisses (1997)	Best Friend (1997)	Edmond 003 - Sparks (1998)

Best Friend (TC: 好朋友) is a Cantopop album by Edmond Leung.

== Track listing ==
1. 0:11 (零時十一分)
2. Best Friend (不問自戀)
3. I Am Accustomed to You (習慣你)
4. Free Lunch (免費午餐)
5. Stop Breathing (斷了氣)
6. To Be Continued (待續)
7. One Day Off (休息一天)
8. Moonlight Pool (月光游泳池)
9. Rainy night (流離夜雨)

== Charts ==
Chart (1997)	Peak position
IFPI Hong Kong Group	1

== Music awards ==
Year	Ceremony	Award
1997	Jade Solid Gold Best Ten Music Awards Presentation	Top 10 Song Awards - Best Friend (好朋友)
