= Veeeeeeeeery Edmond =

Studio album by Edmond Leung
- Released: 13 October 1999
- Genre: Cantopop
- Label: Capital Artists

Edmond Leung chronology
Great Fun at All Times (1999)	Veeeeeeeeery Edmond (1999)	The Butterfly Has Come to This World (2000)

Veeeeeeeeery Edmond (TC: 太太！太太！) is a Cantopop album by Edmond Leung.

== Track listing ==
Disc 1

1. Mrs! Mrs! (太太！太太！)
2. Overnight (一夜之間)
3. Human Disqualification (人間失格)
4. The World Is So K (全世界這麼K)
5. Love Me Now (現在就愛我)

Disc 2

1. You and Me (你和我)
2. June Day (六月天)
3. Ruqirusu (如泣如訴)
4. Paradise Lost (失樂園)
5. Long Term Relationship (細水長流)

== Charts ==
Chart (1999)	Peak position
IFPI Hong Kong Group	8
