= The Rising (memorial) =

Memorial in Valhalla, New York

Coordinates: 41°4′20.53″N 73°45′56.08″W

The Rising is a memorial located in the Kensico Dam Plaza of Valhalla, Westchester County, New York, created by architect Frederic Schwartz. It stands against the backdrop of Kensico Dam, commemorating the September 11 attacks on the US and remembering Westchester County residents who were victims of those attacks.

== Design ==
The design for The Rising was unanimously chosen by the Westchester Family Victims and Survivors Group from among entries in an international design competition. The design process was "an exacting and intense collaborative effort of architects, engineers, 3D computer specialists, sculptors, welders, government representatives, and members of the families" of the victims.

The memorial is dedicated to the victims of the 9-11 attacks from Westchester, and lists the names of residents who died as a result of those attacks, along with the names of the communities within the counties in which they lived. It also includes a quote about each one, engraved along the outside of the memorial's circular base, were chosen by the survivors in their families. From the base, 109 steel rods, one for each of the victims remembered by this memorial, extend like spokes of a wheel which then intertwine. A 110th rod was crafted for the memorial as well, but that rod was cut apart so that each portion could be presented to an individual who helped make this memorial possible.

Architect Frederic Schwartz has stated that the goal of his design was to create a memorial that "invites families and visitors to look back in memory of their loved ones and look forward as a community, and provides a place for prayer and reflection....The 109 intertwined strands (like DNA) rise 80 feet from the ground reaching upward to the heavens. The rods are bound together in a literal and symbolic gesture exemplifying the strength of the Westchester community and the families who lost loved ones."

Schwartz notes that the "reflective quality of the stainless steel" is designed to change according to the time and light of day, so that there is a "dynamic quality" to the structure, and in many ways the visitors themselves will become part of the structure as well. The goal, according to Schwartz, is that the memorial might provide "a gathering place and reaffirms the capacity of individuals as well as the Westchester community to renew and grow."

== The victims ==
109 Westchester residents are remembered through this memorial. The memorial also includes the names of ten additional victims who had been former residents of Westchester. There were actually 110 residents of Westchester; one was unintentionally omitted. The design remained unchanged. The person's name was added to the stones.

== Dedication ==
The memorial was dedicated on September 11, 2006, five years after the attacks. It included a recitation of all the names of the victims remembered by this memorial, music performed by the Mayor's Interfaith Community Choir of Mount Vernon, and a special performance of the 2002 song, "The Rising," created by Bruce Springsteen.

== Awards ==
The Faith and Form Journal (The Interfaith Journal on Religion, Art, and Architecture) recognized The Rising with its 2007 Faith and Form Sacred Landscape Award.

== See also ==
- Empty Sky (9-11 memorial)
- Memorials and services for the September 11 attacks
