= To Love Someone Else =

Studio album by Edmond Leung
- Released: 18 April 1995
- Genre: Cantopop
- Label: Capital Artists

Edmond Leung chronology
The Best (1994)	To Love Someone Else (1995)	Holding You Feels So Good (1995)

To Love Someone Else (TC: 移情別戀) is a Cantopop album by Edmond Leung, released by Capital Artists in 18 April 1995.

The Gold Disc Edition was released by East Asia Music on 23 Dec 2011 in order to celebrate Capital Artists 40th Anniversary.

== Track listing ==
1. To Love Someone Else (移情別戀)
2. Woman are Made of Water (女人用水做)
3. I Hone Myself Through Sorrow (用痛悲磨練自己)
4. Secret Crush Game (暗戀遊戲)
5. Strong Feeling of Love (濃烈愛感覺)
6. Rumor (風聲)
7. Can't leave within one minute (不可以一分鐘別離)
8. Any Resemblance (如有雷同)
9. TV Revelation (TV啟示錄)
10. Give Me Love (給我所愛)

== Charts ==
Chart (1995)	Peak position
IFPI Hong Kong Group	8
