= Edmond Leung =

- 梁漢文
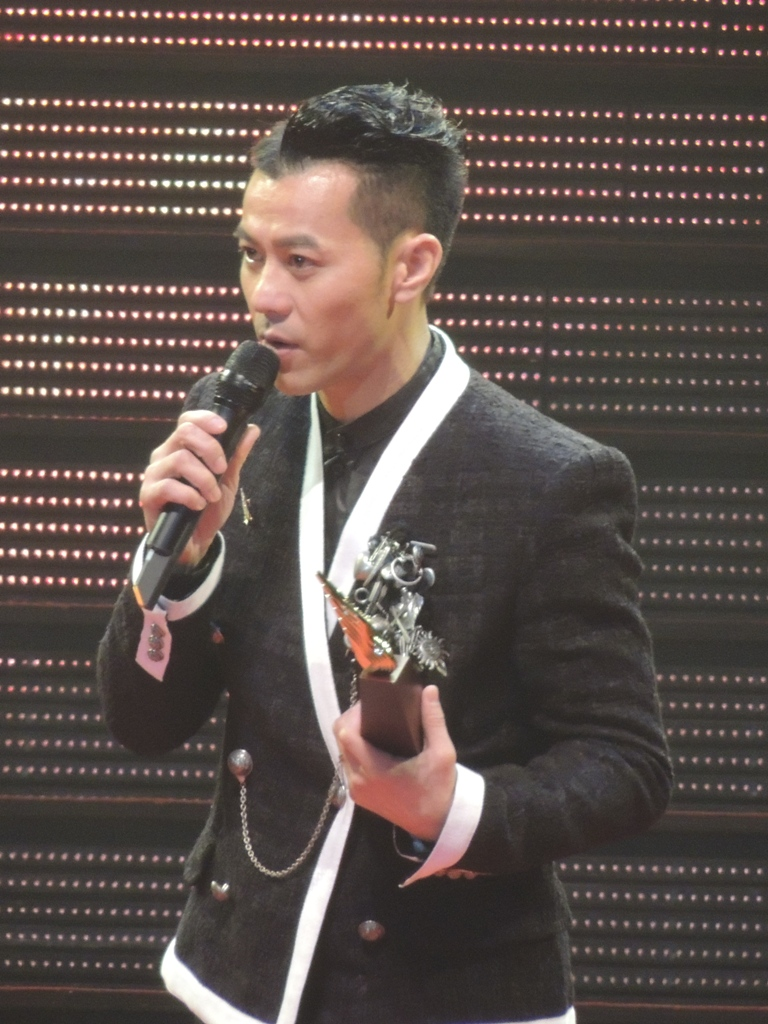
- Leung in 2013
- Born: Edmon Leung Hon-man; 5 November 1971 (age 55); British Hong Kong
- Occupations: Singer-songwriter; record producer; actor; tv host
- Years active: 1990–present
- Spouse: Karen Lam (m. 2008)
- Musical career
- Also known as: Leung Bing (梁炳)
- Origin: Hong Kong
- Genre: Cantopop
- Instruments: Vocals, Piano
- Labels: Capital Artists (1990–2001, 2013–present); Gold Label Records (2002–2013)

Chinese name
- Traditional Chinese: 梁漢文
- Simplified Chinese: 梁汉文
Transcriptions
Standard Mandarin
- Hanyu Pinyin: Liáng Hànwén
Yue: Cantonese
- Jyutping: Loeng^{4} Hon^{3} Man^{4}

Edmond Leung Hon-man (born 5 November 1971) is a Hong Kong singer-songwriter, record producer, actor and television host.

== Background ==
Born in British Hong Kong on 5 November 1971, he was a youth development footballer and coach until 17. At age 17, Leung became a finalist in the eighth annual New Talent Singing Awards (新秀歌唱大賽) in 1989, which won him a contract with Capital Artists. He made his recording debut in 1990 with the release of Listen to the Edge (細聽鋒芒). He propelled to teen idol stardom in the mid-1990s and was famous for his rather feminine look, in which many of his songs portray the life of timid men dumped by their lovers. He was suspended and barred from performing or appearing on variety shows by TVB for three months after he uttered profanity during a live broadcast of the Tung Wah Charity Show in 1995.

In 2001, Capital Artists failed in the market, and Leung was left contract-less for over a year. During this time, Leung began composing music and was the leader of William So's concert band, while also learning to play the piano. Under the guidance of Paco Wong, he signed to Gold Typhoon in 2003, being marketed as a singer-songwriter. That same year, he released his first album under Gold Typhoon, Number 10, which won Best Album of the Year at the Ultimate Song Chart awards.

Some of his hits include "Thinking Too Much" (自作聰明), "Get Lost/Cheating" (滾, duet with Miriam Yeung), "Hey June", "Battleship Team" (艦隊), "8 Mile Highway" (八里公路), "Blooming Flowers in 3000 Years" (三千年開花), "Female News Presenter" (新聞女郎), "Beatles" (披頭四), "501", "Seven Friends" (七友), "Fresh Start" (重新做人), "Madam! Madam!" (太太！太太！), "Big Excitement" (大激想, with Eason Chan and Miriam Yeung), "Best Friend" (好朋友), "A Man in the Closet" (衣櫃裡的男人), "Three Wounded Hearts" (傷了三個心), "Love and Emotions" (愛與情), "Lingering Game" (纏綿遊戲), and "Don't Want To Be Alone" (不願一個人).

In 2008, he performed at the S.U.C.C.E.S.S. Charity Gala at Vancouver, British Columbia, Canada with many other artists. He was a co-host of the popular variety show, Beautiful Cooking with Ronald Cheng and Alex Fong.

== Discography ==
=== Capital Artists releases (1990–2001) ===
| Album # | Album Information | Awards |
|---|---|---|
| 1st | Thinking of You, Waiting for You [想著你等著你]: Released: 18 January 1991; Edmond Leung's first album | |
| 2nd | Confused Feelings [糊塗感情]: Released: 19 May 1993 | |
| 3rd | Don't Wanna Be Alone [不願一個人]: Released: 14 April 1994 | |
| 4th | The Best [壹精選]: Released: 3 November 1994; 1st Greatest hits album; 1st Double-Platinum album | |
| 5th | To Love Someone Else [移情別戀]: Released: 18 April 1995 | |
| 6th | Holding You Feels So Good [抱著妳感覺很好]: Released: November 1995 | |
| 7th | Breathe [呼吸]: Released: 12 July 1996 | JSG Best Ten Music Awards: Top 10 Song (for 呼吸); IFPI Hong Kong Top Sales Music Award 1996: Local Platinum Album |
| 8th | Steal Kisses [偷吻]: Released: 24 January 1997 | IFPI Hong Kong Top Sales Music Award 1997: Local Double-Platinum Album |
| 9th | Best Friend [好朋友]: Released: August 1997 | JSG Best Ten Music Awards: Top 10 Song (for 好朋友); IFPI Hong Kong Top Sales Music Award 1997: Local Gold Album |
| 10th | Edmond 002 [梁漢文貪新戀舊十七首]: Released: 1998 | IFPI Hong Kong Top Sales Music Award 1998: Local Gold Album |
| 11th | Edmond 003 - Sparks [星火]: Released: April 1998 | |
| 12th | Edmond Leung's Greatest Love Songs [梁漢文為你唱情歌17首]: Released: 1998 | |
| 13th | Great Fun At All Times [隨時行樂]: Released: April 1999 | |
| 14th | Veeeeeeeeery Edmond [太太! 太太!]: Released: October 1999 | |
| 15th | The Butterfly Has Come To This World (Mandarin) [蝴蝶來過這世界]: Released: January 2000 | |
| 16th | Parental Guidance [PG家長指引]: Released: October 2000 | Commercial Radio Hong Kong Ultimate Song Chart Awards: Ultimate Top 10 Songs [9th] (for PG家長指引) |
| 17th | Music Is The Answer: Released: August 2001 | Commercial Radio Hong Kong Ultimate Song Chart Awards: Ultimate Top 10 Songs [5th] (for 重新做人) |

=== Gold Label releases(2003–2013) ===
| Album # | Album Information | Awards |
|---|---|---|
| 1st | Edmond 10 [10號]: Released: 16 May 2003 | The Metro Showbiz Hit Awards: Hit Songs (for 七友); JSG Best Ten Music Awards: Top 10 Song (for 七友); RTHK Top 10 Gold Songs: Top 10 Song (for 七友); Commercial Radio Hong Kong Ultimate Song Chart Awards: 1. Ultimate Song Award (for 七友); 2. Ultimate Album (for 10號); 3. Ultimate 4 Channels Album Award (for 10號) |
| 2nd | 03/Four Seasons [03/四季]: Release Date: 1 January 2004 | |
| 3rd | Effort & Love: Released: 11 November 2004 | The Metro Showbiz Hit Awards: Hit Songs (for 艦隊); JSG Best Ten Music Awards: Top 10 Song (for艦隊) |
| 4th | The Story of June: Released: 15 June 2006 | |
| 5th | Edmond's Collection 2007 [梁漢文集 2007]: Released: 27 September 2007 | The Metro Showbiz Hit Awards: Hit Songs (for 自作聰明) |
| 6th | Edmond Hits 48: Released: 12 December 2008 | |
| 7th | Love and Peace: Released: 29 August 2009 | The Metro Showbiz Hit Awards: 1. Hit Songs (for 住家丁麵); 2. Hit Karaoke Song (for 住家丁麵) |
| 8th | #20: Released: 8 September 2011 | The Metro Showbiz Hit Awards: Hit Songs (for 一再問究竟); JSG Best Ten Music Awards: Top 10 Song (for 一再問究竟) |
| 9th | E.d.M.O.N.D: Released: 28 January 2013 | |

=== Capital Artists releases (since 2013) ===
| Album # | Album Information | Awards |
|---|---|---|
| 1st | Embrace Old and New Memories [擁抱新舊記憶]: Released: 20 December 2013 | The Metro Showbiz Hit Awards: 1. Hit Songs (for 半邊生命); 2. Hit Karaoke Song (for 半邊生命); Commercial Radio Hong Kong Ultimate Song Chart Awards: Ultimate Top 10 Songs [5th] (for 半邊生命) |
| 2nd | Queen's Covers (Mandarin) [聽后感]: Release Date: 14 August 2014 | IFPI Hong Kong Top Sales Music Award 2014 : Ten Best Sales Releases (Mandarin); Metro Showbiz Mandarin Music Awards: Hit Songs (for 一步步) |
| 3rd | From There To Here [一路走來]: Release Date: 4 August 2015 | |

== Filmography ==
=== TV series ===
- 1997: The Disappearance (隱形怪傑)
- 1999: Street Fighters (廟街·媽·兄弟) as Wong Man-Dik
- 2002: The Monkey King: Quest for the Sutra (齊天大聖孫悟空) as Tong Sam-Chong
- 2003: Hearts of Fencing (當四葉草碰上劍尖時) as Chiu Chui-Shuet (Mr. Sword)
- 2007: ICAC 2007 (廉政行動2007之沙丘城堡) as Leung Chi-Kit
- 2008: Dressage to Win (盛裝舞步愛作戰) as himself
- 2008: Taste of Happiness (幸福的味道) as Ray
- 2018: Shadow of Justice (蝕日風暴) 裴天成
- 2023: From Hong Kong to Beijing (香港人在北京）

=== Variety shows ===
- 2006: Beautiful Cooking (美女廚房)
- 2009: Beautiful Cooking II (美女廚房2)
- 2021: Call Me By Fire (披荆斩棘的哥哥)

=== Films ===
- 1996: 金枝玉葉II
- 1996: 正牌香蕉俱樂部
- 1996: 運財至叻星
- 1996: 金田一手稿之奇異檔案
- 1996: Mongkok Story (旺角風雲)
- 1996: 假男假女
- 1997: Legend of the Wolf (戰狼傳說)
- 1997: 蘭桂坊七公主
- 1997: 我有我瘋狂
- 1998: 戇豆豆追女仔
- 1998: 對不起，隊林你
- 1998: 烈火青春
- 1999: 有時跳舞
- 2000: 藍煙火
- 2002: 飄忽男女
- 2002: 夏日冬蔭功
- 2002: 心跳
- 2002: Troublesome Night 15 (陰陽路十五之客似魂來)
- 2002: 橫財就手
- 2003: 新收數王之貴利王
- 2003: 魅醒時份
- 2003: 超級特警
- 2003: 現代古惑仔
- 2003: I級暗殺令
- 2003: 午夜出租
- 2003: 鬼味人間II：鬼屋幻影
- 2003: 旺角風雲
- 2003: 我愛一碌葛
- 2004: 甜絲絲
- 2004: 噩夢
- 2006: 春田花花同學會
- 2012: I Love Hong Kong 2012
- 2015: Full Strike
- 2019: The Calling of a Bus Driver
