= Edmond 003 - Sparks =

Studio album by Edmond Leung
- Released: 1998
- Genre: Cantopop
- Label: Capital Artists

Edmond Leung chronology
Best Friend (1997)	Edmond 003 - Sparks (1998)	Great Fun at All Times (1999)

Edmond 003 - Sparks (TC: 星火) is a Cantopop album by Edmond Leung.

== Track listing ==
1. Mars (火星)
2. Mr.Wrong (錯先生)
3. Regular Friend (普通朋友)
4. Electro and Flint (電光火石)
5. 1999
6. Low Season (淡季)
7. Not Bad (未算差)
8. Ten Thousand and One Night (一萬零一夜)
9. I Heard That You Love Me (聽說你愛我)
10. Sparks (星火)

== Charts ==
Chart (1998)	Peak position
IFPI Hong Kong Group	1
