= Don't Wanna Be Alone =

Studio album by Edmond Leung
- Released: 14 April 1994
- Recorded: January 1994
- Genre: Cantopop
- Label: Capital Artists

Edmond Leung chronology
Confused Feelings (1993)	Don't Wanna Be Alone (1994)	The Best (1994)

Don't Wanna Be Alone (TC: 不願一個人) is a Cantopop album by Edmond Leung, released by Capital Artists in 14 April 1994.

The Gold Disc Edition was released by East Asia Music on 20 Sep 2011 in order to celebrate Capital Artists 40th Anniversary.

== Track listing ==
1. 100% In Love with You (一百巴仙愛上你)
2. Tie Me Up, Tie Me Down (綑著我困著我)
3. Don't Wanna Be Alone (不願一個人)
4. Even I Feel Sad (即使傷心又如何)
5. Lingering Games (纏綿遊戲)
6. 5000% of Love (五千巴仙的愛)
7. Rare Love (不可多得的愛)
8. Empty Sky (空空天空)
9. Classic Kiss (經典之吻)
10. The Other Man (第三者)
11. After Sunrise (日出之後)
