= Empty Sky (memorial) =

Sculpture; official New Jersey September 11 memorial

Coordinates: 40.708303°N 74.034628°W

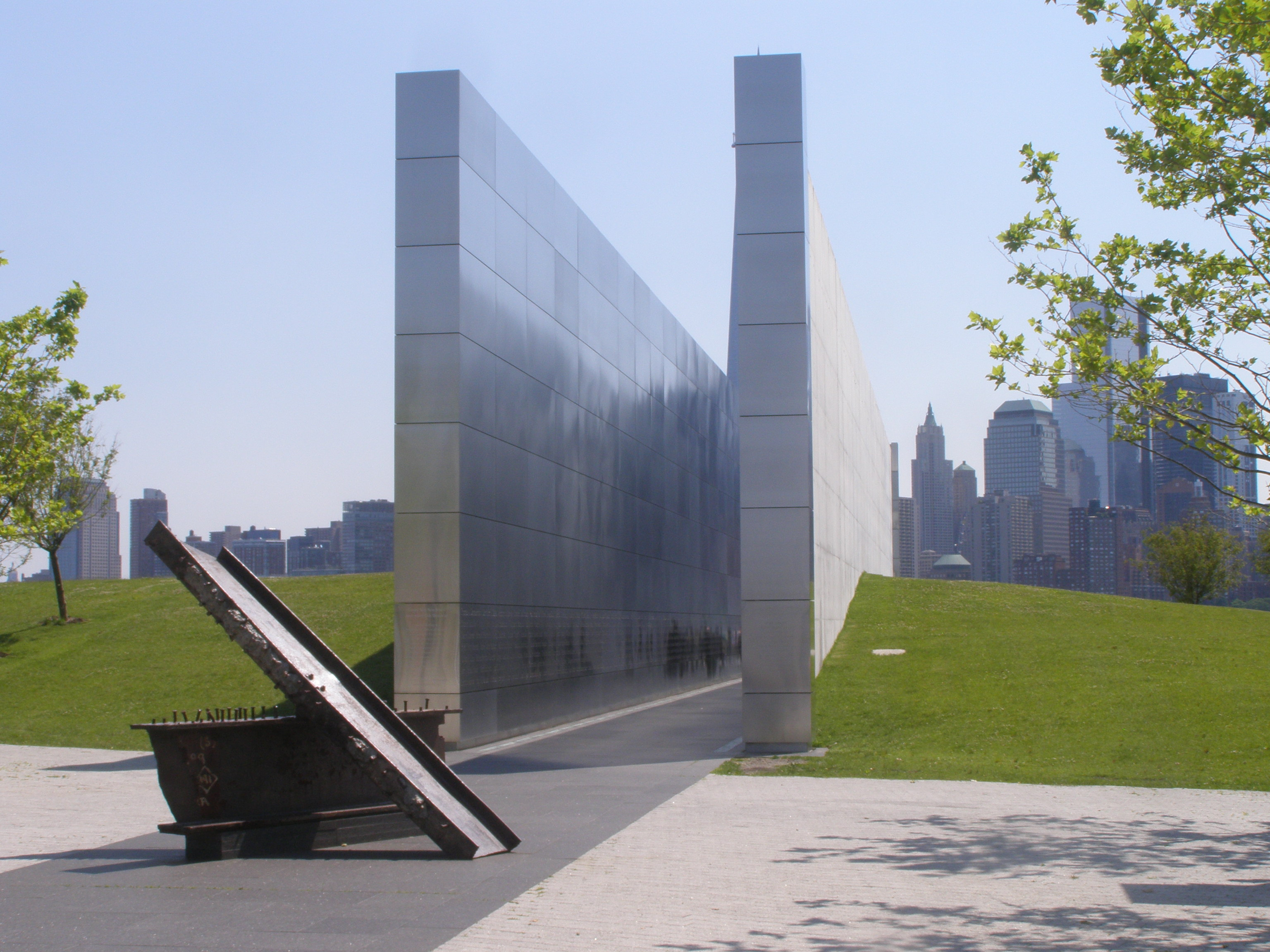
The Empty Sky memorial

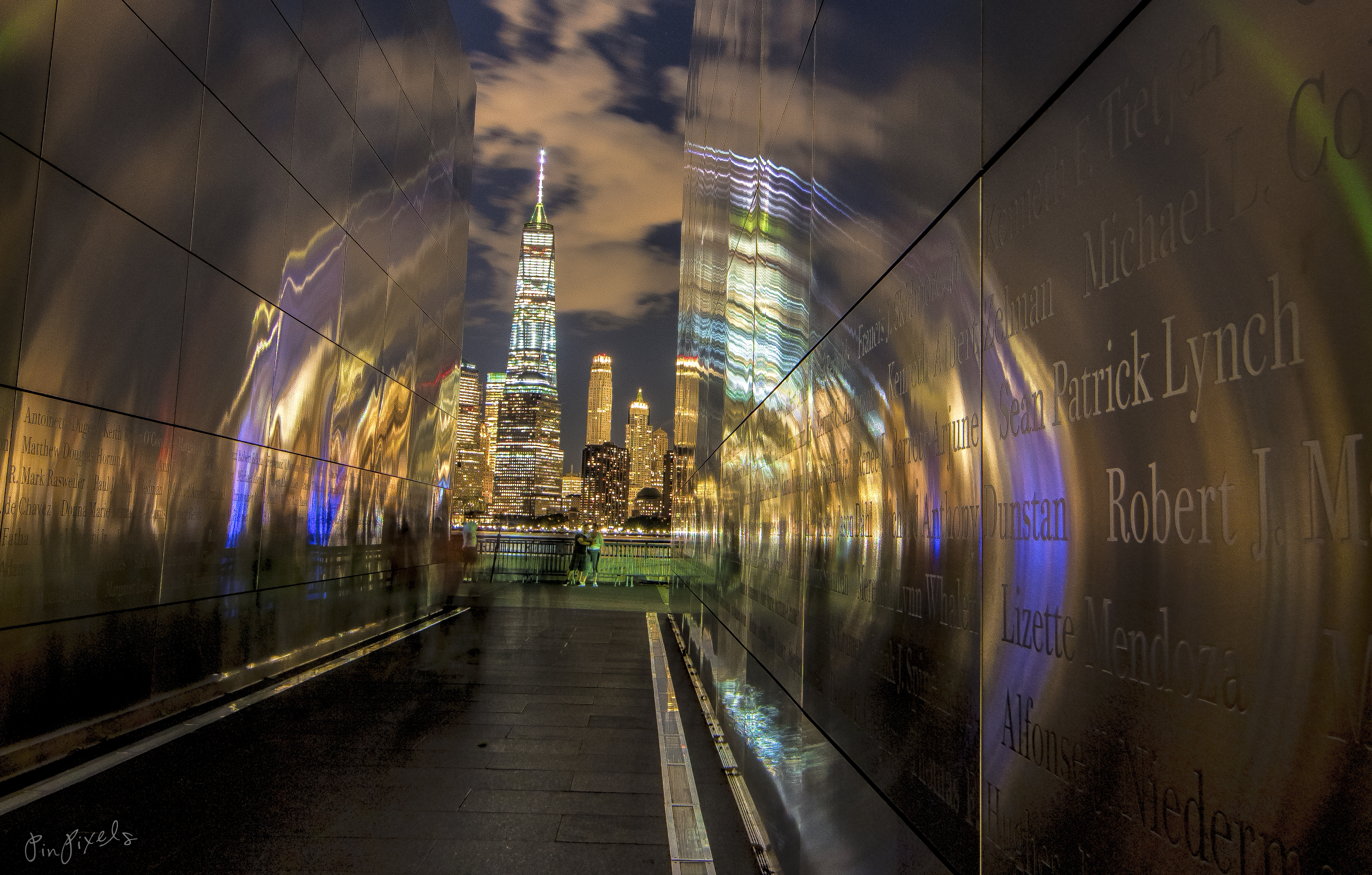
Inside the Empty Sky memorial at night

Empty Sky is the official New Jersey September 11 memorial to the state's victims of the September 11 attacks on the United States. It is located in Liberty State Park in Jersey City at the mouth of the Hudson River across from the World Trade Center site. It was designed by Jessica Jamroz and Frederic Schwartz and dedicated on Saturday, September 10, 2011, a day before the tenth anniversary of the attacks.

== Design ==
The design was chosen by the vote of the Families and Survivors Memorial Committee, out of 320 qualified entries in the international design competition. The memorial is dedicated to 746 New Jerseyans killed in the World Trade Center in 1993 and in the September 11 attacks, as well as those who died at the Pentagon and in Shanksville, Pennsylvania. The New Jersey 9/11 Memorial Foundation has stated that the goal of this memorial is to "reflect the legacies of those whose lives were lost, that their unfulfilled dreams and hopes may result in a better future for society. Their unique qualities and characteristics enriched our lives immeasurably and through this memorial, their stories live on." The memorial includes twin walls, transecting a "gently sloped mound anchored by a granite path that is directed toward Ground Zero. Two 30-foot (9.1 m)-high rectangular towers stretch 208 feet 10 inches (63.65 m) long—the exact width of the World Trade Center towers; the height of the walls is proportionate to the length to represent the buildings as if they were lying on their sides. The name of each of the 746 victims is etched in stainless steel in 4-inch (10 cm) letters. A granite passage is oriented to face the site of the World Trade Center. The name of the memorial is taken from the Bruce Springsteen song "Empty Sky", which is about the "empty sky" where the towers once stood.

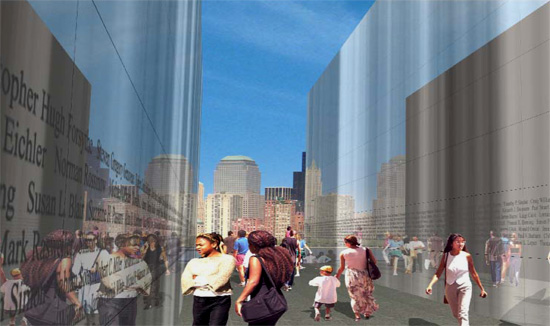
Artist's rendering of visitors between the two walls of Empty Sky.

Frederic Schwartz, who co-authored the design with Jessica Jamroz, stated that he "listened to the needs and aspirations of the victims' relatives, friends and co-workers", and did not arrive "with a preconceived aesthetic approach." Schwartz who, along with Jamroz, also created The Rising, the Westchester County, New York September 11 memorial, stated that "You start over each time. ... You do serious research, delve into the site, into the problem."

Some observers noted that the memorial is "reminiscent of Maya Lin's Vietnam War memorial in Washington," with its walls filled with names, listed within easy reach and engraved deeply enough to make hand rubbings possible, but one of the many differences between that design and this one will be the way the memorial visually connects New Jersey with the skyline of New York - with the memorial walls symbolic of the felled twin towers across the Hudson River.

=== Controversy ===
Plans for the memorial were met with some controversy, and a non-profit advocacy group for Liberty State Park called "Friends of Liberty State Park" (FOLSP) filed a lawsuit to halt the project. The group stated that the memorial would block "panoramic Manhattan views," and that it should not be built or should be relocated to an area near the 750-tree "Grove of Remembrance," an existing memorial to 9/11 victims. Sam Pesin, president of FOLSP, stated that the "main message" which the group wanted to make clear is that "the governor, in this severe economic crisis, is wasting...taxpayers' money."

Some of those in favor of the memorial called the action of FOLSP a "frivolous lawsuit," and the Appellate Division of New Jersey Superior Court ruled in favor of the state's plans for the memorial in November 2009. A spokesman for Governor Jon Corzine said that the memorial is the "result of an open public process".

== Construction ==
Funding for the memorial was provided by the state, the Port Authority of New York and New Jersey, and the New Jersey Building Association.

Construction bids twelve million dollars higher than the projected cost of the memorial (due to the international spike in the price of stainless steel) resulted in a construction delay in 2007.

Construction began in May 2009, with a push to complete the memorial by August 15, 2011, in time for its scheduled September 11, 2011 dedication. Although the inside of the walls remained stainless steel, changes to the original design include a plan to use "architecturally finished concrete" for the outside surfaces, so that it will look more attractive than the "flat, drab coating of most concrete finishes."

Although the memorial was opened to the public and was dedicated in 2011, the memorial remained incomplete, with 9/11 family members who selected the original design still wanting “stainless steel to cover the memorial’s outward-facing concrete walls”. As of June 2025, the outward steel covers had yet to be added and was in a state of disrepair, which authorities said the issues surrounding non-working kiosks, lightings, and removed trees would be addressed but without a timeline given.

== Dedication ==
Dedication ceremonies took place September 10, 2011 and were attended by a number of notable political figures, including Governor Chris Christie of New Jersey, five former governors of the state, presidential advisor John O. Brennan, Senators Frank Lautenberg and Robert Menendez and family members of those whose names are inscribed on the monument.

== See also ==
- List of public art in Jersey City, New Jersey
- The Rising (memorial)
- To the Struggle Against World Terrorism
- Liberation (Holocaust memorial)
- Memorials and services for the September 11 attacks
