= List of public art in Jersey City, New Jersey =

This is a list of public art in Jersey City, New Jersey, in the United States. This list applies only to works of public art on permanent display in an outdoor public space and does not include artworks in museums. Public art may include sculptures, statues, monuments, memorials, murals, and mosaics.

Image	Title / subject	Location and coordinates	Date	Artist / designer	Type	Material	Dimensions	Designation	Owner / administrator	Wikidata	Notes
	America Triumphant	Pershing Field; Jersey City Heights 40°44′32″N 74°03′12″W	1922	James Novelli	Sculpture	Bronze					
	Buffalo and Bears	Dr. Leonard J. Gordon Park; Western Slope; Jersey City Heights 40°44′44.6″N 74°03′28.8″W	1907	Solon Borglum	Sculptures	Painted concrete			City of Jersey City		
	Bust of Henry Hudson	Riverview-Fiske Park; Jersey City Heights 40°44′41.6″N 74°02′35.6″W	1917	Anthony Schaff	Bust	Gilded concrete			City of Jersey City		
	By Definition	New Jersey City University (now Kean Jersey City) 40°42′34″N 74°05′19″W	2006	Maya Lin	Sculpture	Stone					
More images	Colgate Clock	Hudson River Waterfront Walkway (at the foot of Essex St) 40°42′43.3″N 74°02′02″W	1924		Clock					Q5144779	
More images	Empty Sky	Liberty State Park 40.708303°N 74.034628°W	2011	Jessica Jamroz; Frederic Schwartz	Memorial	Stainless steel				Q5374723	
More images	Hudson County Courthouse Murals	Hudson County Courthouse 40°43′54.2″N 74°3′26.1″W	1901	*Edwin Howland Blashfield; *Kenyon Cox; *Francis Davis Millet; *Howard Pyle; *Charles Yardley Turner	Murals				Hudson County	Q5374723	
	Jersey City Murals	City-wide	2012 to date	over 138 artist	over 200 outdoor murals	Paint					
More images	Jersey City 9/11 Memorial	Hudson River Waterfront Walkway; Paulus Hook near Exchange Place 40°42′53.4″N 74°01′59.8″W	2002, 2004		Stele, Sculpture, Statue	Granite, Steel, Bronze					
	Jersey City Police Memorial	City Hall; Downtown 40°43′7″N 74°02′52″W	1936		Statue	Bronze and steel					
	Katyń Memorial	Exchange Place 40°42′58″N 74°01′59″W	1991	Andrzej Pitynski	Statue	Bronze				Q6378565	
	Korean War Veterans Memorial	Hudson River Walkway; Morris Canal Park; Paulus Hook 40°42′40″N 74°02′19″W	2002		Statue, obelisks, panels	Black granite					
	Liberation	Liberty State Park 40.6927°N 74.0558°W	1985	Nathan Rapoport	Memorial	Bronze				Q6540978	
	Lincoln the Mystic	Lincoln Park 40.724640°N 74.080939°W	1930	James Earle Fraser	Statue	Bronze				Q6551213	
More images	Martin Luther King, Jr. Memorial	MLK Drive; Jackson Hill 40.7121°N 74.0773°W	2000	Jonathan Shahn	Bust; Bas reliefs	Bronze; Granite				Q108830658	
	Peter Stuyvesant Monument	Journal Square 40.730933°N 74.065711°W	1911		Statue	Bronze					
	Statue of Christopher Columbus	Journal Square 40.732142°N 74.063114°W	1950	Archimedes Giacomantonio	Statue	Bronze and granite					One of three Columbus statues in Hudson County by the artist
	Statue of Mary McLeod Bethune	Greenville 40°42′18.5″N 74°05′12.4″W	2021	Alvin Petit	Statue	Bronze					
	Statue of Jackie Robinson	Journal Square 40.732141°N 74.063114°W	1998	Susan Wagner	Statue	Bronze				Q108841403	
More images	Soldiers, Sailors and Marines Memorial	City Hall; Downtown 40°43′7″N 74°02′53″W	1899	Philip Martiny	Statue	Bronze			City of Jersey City		
	La Vela di Colombo	Hudson River Waterfront Walkway; Liberty State Park 40°42′21″N 74°2′36″W	1992; 1998	Gino Gianetti	Sculpture	bronze	6 metres (20 ft) (height)				
	Water's Soul	Hudson River Waterfront Walkway; Newport 40°43′51″N 74°01′42″W	2021	Jaume Plensa	Sculpture	Polyester resin Fiberglass; Marble dust				Q108830467	
	Wave	Washington Park; Jersey City Heights 40°45′16.2″N 74°02′35.9″W	2008	Chakaia Booker	Sculpture	Brushed stainless steel	14 feet (4.3 m)high and 35 feet (11 m) wide		Hudson County Park System		

== See also ==
- Lincoln Park (Jersey City)
- Pershing Field
- List of public art in Newark, New Jersey
