= Salemme =

Salemme is a family surname of Italian origin. It may refer to:

- Antonio Salemme (1892–1995), Italian-born American painter
- Attilio Salemme (1911–1955) American painter and muralist
- Britta Curl-Salemme (born 2000), American ice hockey player
- Erasmo Salemme (born 1946), Italian volleyball player and coach
- Frank Salemme (1933–2022), American mobster, boss of the Patriarca family
- Lucia Autorino Salemme (c. 1919–2010), American painter, educator, and writer
- Vincenzo Salemme (born 1957), Italian actor, playwright and director
