= Statue of Jackie Robinson =

Statue of Jackie Robinson may refer to:

- Statue of Jackie Robinson (Jersey City), U.S.
- Statue of Jackie Robinson (Wichita, Kansas), U.S.

== See also ==
- A Handshake for the Century
- Stealing Home (statue), statue of Jackie Robinson at Dodger Stadium in Los Angeles, California, U.S.
