= List of Polish-American Medal of Honor recipients =

The Medal of Honor was created during the American Civil War and is the highest military decoration presented by the United States government to a member of its armed forces. A recipient must distinguish themselves at the risk of their own life above and beyond the call of duty in action against an enemy of the United States. The medal is presented to the recipient by the President of the United States on behalf of the Congress.

== World War II ==
Lavender background along with † indicates that the Medal of Honor was awarded posthumously

Note: Notes in quotations are derived or are copied from the official Medal of Honor citation

Image	Name	Service	Rank	Place of action	Date of action	Notes
	Stephen R. Gregg	Army	Technical Sergeant	Montélimar, France	August 27, 1944	"As his platoon advanced upon the enemy positions; the leading scout was fired upon and Second Lieutenant Gregg immediately put his machine guns into action to cover the advance of the riflemen. The Germans, who were at close range, threw hand grenades at the riflemen, killing some and wounding seven. Each time a medical aid man attempted to reach the wounded, the Germans fired at him. Realizing the seriousness of the situation, Second Lieutenant Gregg took one of the light .30-caliber machine guns, and firing from the hip, started boldly up the hill with the medical aid man following him. Although the enemy was throwing hand grenades at him, Second Lieutenant Gregg remained and fired into the enemy positions while the medical aid man removed the seven wounded men to safety."
	Matt Urban	Army	Captain	Renouf, France	June 14, 1944 – September 3, 1944	An infantry company and battalion commander with many decorations and awards including seven Purple Hearts in World War II: "Distinguished himself by a series of bold, heroic actions, exemplified by a singularly outstanding combat leadership, personal bravery, and tenacious devotion to duty... Captain Urban's personal leadership, limitless bravery, and repeated extraordinary exposure to enemy fire served as an inspiration to his entire battalion. His valourous and intrepid actions reflect the utmost credit on him and uphold the noble traditions of the United States Army."
	Frank P. Witek †	Marine Corps	Private First Class	Guam, Mariana Islands	August 3, 1944	"When his rifle platoon was halted by heavy surprise fire from well camouflaged enemy positions, Private First Class Witek daringly remained standing to fire a full magazine from his automatic point-blank range into a depression housing Japanese troops, killing eight of the enemy and enabling the greater part of his platoon to take cover. During his platoon's withdrawal for consolidation of lines, he remained to safeguard a severely wounded comrade, courageously returning the enemy's fire until the arrival of stretcher bearers and then covering the evacuation by sustained fire as he moved backward toward his own lines. With his platoon again pinned down by a hostile machine-gun, Private First Class Witek, on his own initiative, moved forward boldly ahead of the reinforcing tanks and infantry, alternately throwing hand grenades and firing as he advanced to within five to ten yards of the enemy position, destroying the hostile machine-gun emplacement and an additional eight Japanese before he, himself, was struck down by an enemy rifleman. His valiant and inspiring action effectively reduced the enemy's firepower, thereby enabling his platoon to attain its objective, and reflects the highest credit upon Private First Class Witek and the United States Naval Service. He gallantly gave his life for his country."
	Joseph R. Sarnoski †	United States Army Air Forces	Second lieutenant	Bougainville, Solomon Islands	June 16, 1943	"For conspicuous gallantry and intrepidity in action above and beyond the call of duty. On 16 June 1943, 2d Lt. Sarnoski volunteered as bombardier of a crew on an important photographic mapping mission covering the heavily defended Buka area, Solomon Islands. When the mission was nearly completed, about 20 enemy fighters intercepted. At the nose guns, 2d Lt. Sarnoski fought off the first attackers, making it possible for the pilot to finish the plotted course. When a coordinated frontal attack by the enemy extensively damaged his bomber, and seriously injured 5 of the crew, 2d Lt. Sarnoski, though wounded, continued firing and shot down 2 enemy planes. A 20-millimeter shell which burst in the nose of the bomber knocked him into the catwalk under the cockpit. With indomitable fighting spirit, he crawled back to his post and kept on firing until he collapsed on his guns. 2d Lt. Sarnoski by resolute defense of his aircraft at the price of his life, made possible the completion of a vitally important mission."
	Sylvester Antolak †	United States Army	Sergeant	Cisterna di Latina, Italy	May 24, 1944	"The President of the United States of America, in the name of Congress, takes pride in presenting the Medal of Honor (Posthumously) to Sergeant Sylvester Antolak (ASN: 35035020), United States Army, for conspicuous gallantry and intrepidity in action above and beyond the call of duty on 24 May 1944, while serving with Company B, 1st Battalion, 15th Infantry Regiment, 3d Infantry Division, near Cisterna di Littoria, Italy. Sergeant Antolak charged 200 yards over flat, coverless terrain to destroy an enemy machinegun nest during the second day of the offensive which broke through the German cordon of steel around the Anzio beachhead. Fully 30 yards in advance of his squad, he ran into withering enemy machinegun, machine-pistol and rifle fire. Three times he was struck by bullets and knocked to the ground, but each time he struggled to his feet to continue his relentless advance. With one shoulder deeply gashed and his right arm shattered, he continued to rush directly into the enemy fire concentration with his submachine gun wedged under his uninjured arm until within 15 yards of the enemy strong point, where he opened fire at deadly close range, killing two Germans and forcing the remaining ten to surrender. He reorganized his men and, refusing to seek medical attention so badly needed, chose to lead the way toward another strong point 100 yards distant. Utterly disregarding the hail of bullets concentrated upon him, he had stormed ahead nearly three-fourths of the space between strong points when he was instantly killed by hostile enemy fire. Inspired by his example, his squad went on to overwhelm the enemy troops. By his supreme sacrifice, superb fighting courage, and heroic devotion to the attack, Sergeant Antolak was directly responsible for eliminating 20 Germans, capturing an enemy machinegun, and clearing the path for his company to advance"

== Vietnam War ==
The Vietnam War was a military conflict between the Communist-supported Democratic Republic of Vietnam and the United States-supported Republic of Vietnam. It started in 1959 and concluded April 30, 1975 with the defeat and failure of the United States foreign policy in Vietnam.

During the Vietnam War, 246 Medals of Honor were received, 154 of them posthumously.

Image	Name	Service	Rank	Place of action	Date of action	Notes	References
	John Levitow	Air Force	Airman First Class	Long Binh Army post, Republic of Vietnam	Feb 24, 1969	Although severely wounded himself from a mortar round, he moved another wounded crew member to safety. He then used his own body to smother and move a smoking flare from within the cargo compartment of the aircraft and threw it from the back of the plane as it separated and ignited in the air as it cleared the aircraft.	
