= University of Connecticut Historic District =

Historic district in Connecticut, United States

- University of Connecticut Historic District-Connecticut Agricultural School
- U.S. National Register of Historic Places
- U.S. Historic district
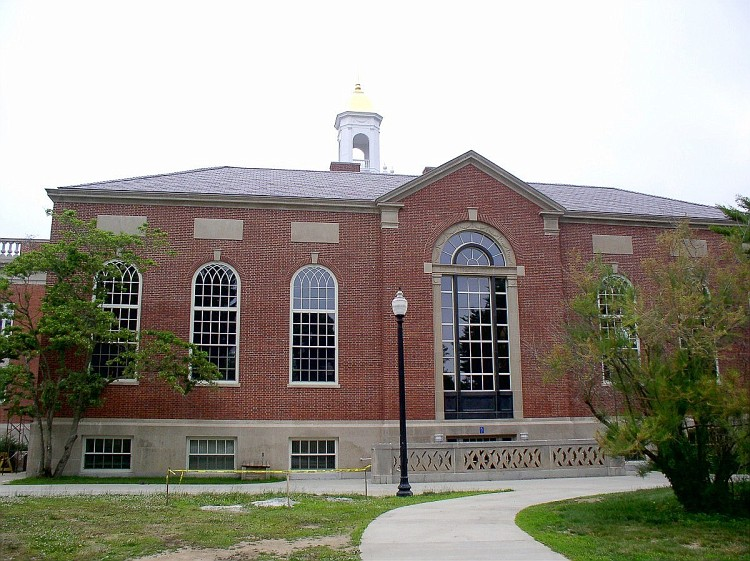
- The Wilbur Cross Library

- Location within Connecticut Location within the United States
- Location: Roughly Storrs Road (Connecticut Route 195) at Eagleville Road (Connecticut Route 275), Storrs, Connecticut
- Coordinates: 41°48′29″N 72°15′3″W
- Area: 105 acres (42 ha)
- Architect: Charles N. Lowrie
- Architectural style: Late 19th and 20th Century Revivals; Federal; Collegiate Gothic
- NRHP reference No.: 88003202
- Added to NRHP: January 31, 1989

The University of Connecticut Historic District is a 105-acre (42 ha) historic district including the historic campus of the Connecticut Agricultural School, now the main campus of the University of Connecticut (UConn) in Storrs, Connecticut.

== Site description ==
The Historic District is located Storrs, a village of the town of Mansfield, Connecticut, flanking Storrs Road (Connecticut Route 195). The principal elements of the district are 23 masonry buildings erected between 1906 and 1942, in Collegiate Gothic, Colonial Revival, and Classical Revival styles. There are also 18 residential structures, some dating to the 18th century, and including the President's House, built in 1940. These are located in an area historically known as Faculty Row, which is now part of Whitney and Gilbert Roads. The master plan for the campus was drafted in the early 20th century by Charles N. Lowrie, a landscape architect, and was followed to a substantial degree by subsequent development. The only non-university buildings in the district are those associated with the Storrs Community Church.

UConn is historically significant as the nation's first public university established specifically for the study of agriculture. It was founded in 1881 as the Storrs Agricultural School, named for its donors (Charles and Augustus Storrs) and the village where its campus was located. The school remained small and focused on agriculture until the early 20th century. In 1906, the school began to expand both its physical plant and its curriculum, although the latter remained focused on agricultural subjects such as farm machinery and horticulture. This building program, largely completed by 1935, produced most of the assemblage of masonry buildings contained in the historic district. In 1933, the school was renamed Connecticut State College, and in 1939 it was given its present name.

The district was listed on the National Register of Historic Places in 1989.

== Demolition ==
In the Spring of 2017, seven of nine houses on Gilbert road were demolished to create a park area.

== See also ==
- National Register of Historic Places listings in Tolland County, Connecticut
