= Holy Cross Cemetery (North Arlington, New Jersey) =

Cemetery in New Jersey, United States

- Interactive map of Holy Cross Cemetery

Details
- Location: North Arlington, New Jersey
- Country: United States
- Coordinates: 40.79174°N 74.13085°W
- Type: Catholic
- Owned by: Roman Catholic Archdiocese of Newark
- Size: 208 acres (0.84 km^{2})
- No. of graves: 289,600 in 2013
- Website: Official website
- Find a Grave: Holy Cross Cemetery

Holy Cross Cemetery is a Catholic cemetery located in North Arlington, New Jersey, United States. Since its establishment in 1915, it has interred over 289,000 individuals. The cemetery operates under the supervision of the Archdiocese of Newark. The cemetery is 208 acres (0.84 km^{2}) in size and located in North Arlington, at the south end of Bergen County. By August 2013, the cemetery had provided burial or entombment facilities for 289,600 individuals.

== History ==
The cemetery was established in 1915 and now has 168 acres (0.68 km^{2}) used for graves or developed for interment.

There is another 40 acres (160,000 m^{2}) allocated for development. The mausoleum is being expanded, creating 6,100 aboveground spaces for crypts and 920 niches for cremated remains. The completed building will have 35,747 interment spaces. It continues to offer ground for new graves as well as private and community Chapel Mausoleum facilities.

== Notable interments ==
- Richard Boiardo, (1890–1984), gangster
- Dominick V. Daniels (1908–1987), represented New Jersey's 14th congressional district from 1959 to 1977.
- Sam Dente (1922–2002), Major League Baseball shortstop from 1947 to 1955.
- Archimedes Giacomantonio (1906–1988), sculptor
- Stephen R. Gregg (1914–2005), awarded Medal of Honor for gallantry during World War II
- James Hall (1900–1940), actor
- Maria Jeritza (1887–1982), opera singer
- John Gerald Milton (1881–1977), United States Senator from New Jersey.
- Nick Piantanida (1932–1966) First civilian space program. Attempted to sky dive from the edge of space at a record of 123,800 feet.
- Frank E. Rodgers (1909–2000), Mayor of Harrison, New Jersey for 48 years
- Attilio Salemme (1911–1955), painter
- Lucia Autorino Salemme (c. 1919–2010) painter, educator, and writer
- Ellen Tauscher (1951–2019), represented California's 10th congressional district from 1997 to 2009.
- Venus Xtravaganza (1965–1988), transgender performer, featured in Jennie Livingston's 1990 documentary film Paris Is Burning.

== See also ==
- Bergen County Cemeteries
