= Statue of Christopher Columbus (Giacomantonio) =

Three sculptures in New Jersey

There are three sculptures of Christopher Columbus in Hudson County, New Jersey created by Archimedes Giacomantonio. The tributes to Columbus become contentious around 2020 when there were calls for removal and subsequent rebuttals of their retention.

== Columbus Park (1937) ==
Columbus Park is a Hudson County park on Clinton Street in Hoboken. The statue created in 1937 is a bronze depicting Columbus with a sword hanging from his belt and a cross around his neck, on a granite pedestal.

Reproductions of the work were installed in Columbus Park in Memphis, Tennessee and Hazleton, Pennsylvania.

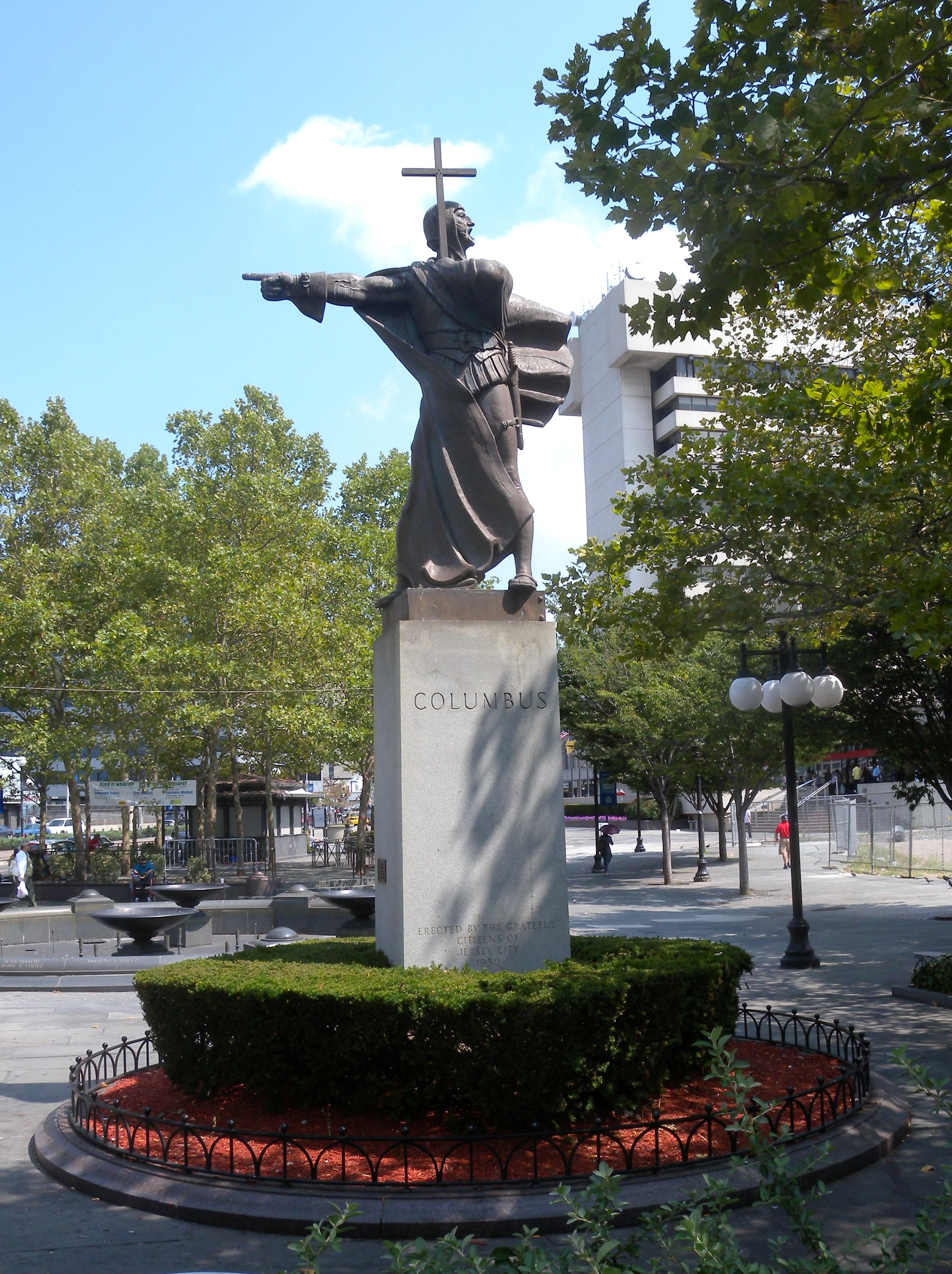
Journal Square

== Journal Square (1950) ==
The Columbus statue at Journal Square (40.732142°N 74.063114°W) in Jersey City was dedicated on October 15, 1950. Originally situated in a traffic island across from Loew's Jersey Theatre in 1998 it was moved to a pedestrian plaza. The ten-foot bronze statue is mounted on a white marble shaft and depicts Columbus "in a militant pose, holding a cross in his left hand and pointing westward with his right." Funding for the statue was through private subscription. While on county-owned land, it is not property of the county and is partially maintained by the local chapter of the Dante Alighieri Society. A plaque was added to the pedestal when rededicated on October 12, 1992, in memory of Edward F. Zampella, the "Voice of the Columbus Day Parade."

Lincoln the Rail Splitter, is a work created by Giacomoantonio when he was 19 years old. The graduating class of Lincoln High School purchased the work for the school in 1926. The Police Monument was created in 1936.

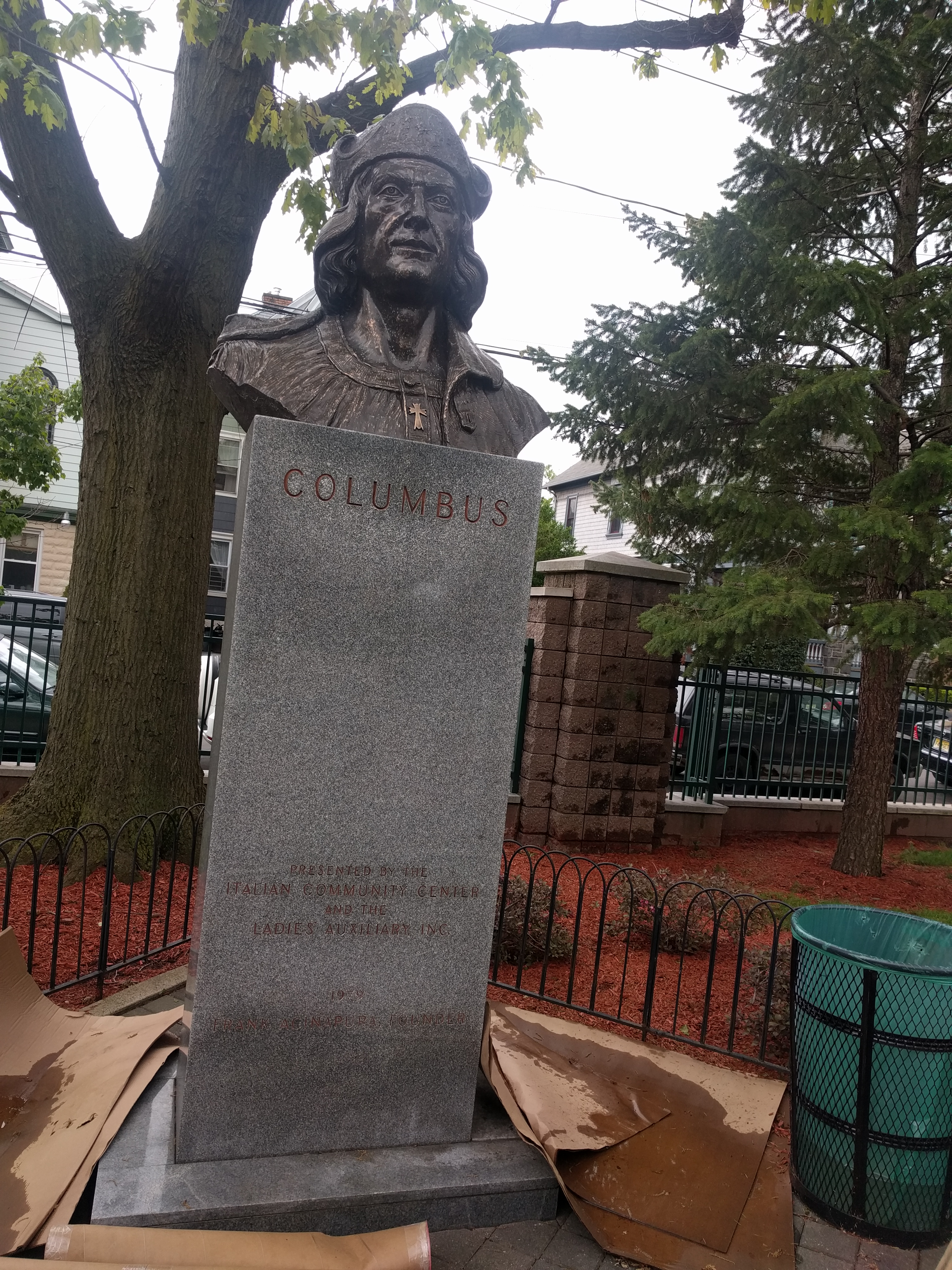
Ellsworth Park

== Ellsworth Park (1979) ==
Ellsworth Park is a city square between Palisade Avenue, New York Avenue and 23rd and 24th streets in Union City. Made in 1979, the bronze bust of Columbus is situated on a granite pedestal. It was cast at Roman Bronze Works.

Another Giacomoantonio work in Union City is the Monument to Soldiers, Sailors and Marines. Known as the Spanish–American War Memorial it was dedicated in Veterans Memorial Plaza (formerly Triangle Park), at Palisades Avenue and 33rd Street on September 29, 1940, and is dedicated to the "memory of the soldiers, sailors and marines who fought in the war with Spain in 1898."

== See also ==
- List of monuments and memorials to Christopher Columbus
- List of public art in Jersey City, New Jersey
