= Statue of Jackie Robinson (Jersey City) =

Bronze sculpture in New Jersey, U.S.

Coordinates: 40.732141°N 74.063114°W

Jack Roosevelt Robinson
- Artist: Susan Wagner
- Year: 1998
- Type: Bronze
- Dimensions: 14 ft (4.3 m) (height)
- Location: Journal Square Jersey City, New Jersey

The Statue of Jackie Robinson in Jersey City, New Jersey is located at Journal Square at the entrance to the Journal Square Transportation Center.

== Statue ==
The work was conceived by Susan Wagner and was dedicated on February 26, 1998.

The statue depicts Jackie Robinson with both arms outstretched, his catching hand gloved. It is 14 feet (4.3 m) tall, and consists of quarter inch thick bronze, 1,500 lb (680 kg) of bronze reinforced with 1,000 lb (450 kg) of stainless steel armature and mounting plate. The inscription on the plaque at its foot uses the name Jack Roosevelt Robinson (1919 - 1972) and quotes the player himself: "A life is not important except in the impact it has on other lives.”

The work was commissioned the Jackie Robinson Foundation, and installed in partnership with the Port Authority of New York & New Jersey, the City of Jersey City, the New Jersey Sports History Commission, and others.

== Significance ==
On April 18, 1946 — opening day of the International League season — Robinson, the 26-year-old second baseman, took the field for the Montreal Royals against the Jersey City Giants, a Class AAA affiliate of the New York Giants, thus becoming the first African American player to break the baseball color line in the modern era of segregated professional baseball. The game took place at Jersey City's since-demolished Roosevelt Stadium (Droyer's Point at the foot of Danforth Avenue at Route 440). The Giants sold 52,000 tickets (more than double the stadium's capacity of 23,000). Robinson went on to have four hits including a 3-run homer, with 4 RBI, 4 runs scored, and 2 stolen bases in Montreal's 14–1 win. A year later, Robinson would again break the color line when he debuted with the Major League Baseball's Brooklyn Dodgers on April 15, 1947.

== See also ==
- A Handshake for the Century
- List of public art in Jersey City, New Jersey
