= Sam Dente =

American baseball player (1922–2002)

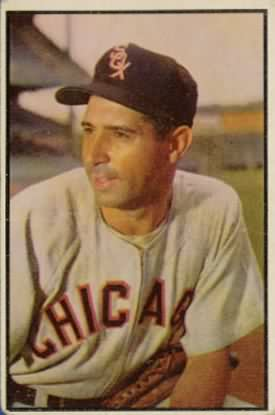
- Shortstop
- Born: April 26, 1922; Harrison, New Jersey, U.S.
- Died: April 21, 2002 (aged 79); Montclair, New Jersey, U.S.
- Batted: Right Threw: Right

MLB debut
- July 10, 1947, for the Boston Red Sox

Last MLB appearance
- September 13, 1955, for the Cleveland Indians

MLB statistics
- Batting average: .252
- Home runs: 4
- Runs batted in: 214
- Stats at Baseball Reference

Teams
- Boston Red Sox (1947); St. Louis Browns (1948); Washington Senators (1949–1951); Chicago White Sox (1952–1953); Cleveland Indians (1954–1955)

Samuel Joseph Dente (April 26, 1922 – April 21, 2002) was an American shortstop in Major League Baseball who played for five different teams between 1947 and 1955. Listed at 5 ft 11 in (1.80 m), 175 lb., Dente batted and threw right-handed. He was born in Harrison, New Jersey and played high school baseball at Kearny High School.

== Career ==
A competent infielder and light-hitting batter, Dente was signed by the Boston Red Sox as a free agent in 1941, but almost immediately had to serve in the military during World War II. After discharge, he was a member of the 1946 Scranton Red Sox, a team that posted a 90–43 record in the Eastern League and ranks 90th in the Minor League Baseball all-time teams list. He appeared in 139 games, hitting a respectable .289 average with 77 RBI and eight stolen bases.

Dente reached the majors in 1947 with the Red Sox, playing for them one year before joining the St. Louis Browns (1948), Washington Senators (1949–1951), Chicago White Sox (1952–1953) and Cleveland Indians (1954–1955). His most productive years came with Washington, hitting a career-high .273 with 24 doubles and 53 RBI in 153 games during the 1949 season. In 1950 he posted career-numbers in games (155), runs (56), RBI (59) and extrabases (29), being considered in the American League MVP vote. As a member of the Indians, he served as a backup for George Strickland, appearing in 68 games for a team that won 111 games and advanced to the 1954 World Series. In three Series games, he went 0-for-3 with one run and a walk.

In a nine-season career, Dente was a .252 hitter with four home runs and 214 RBI in 745 games, including 205 runs, 585 hits, 78 doubles, 16 triples, and nine stolen bases. A patient hitter and very hard to strike out, he averaged one strikeout for every 24.16 at-bats (96-to-2320).

Dente died in Montclair, New Jersey, just five days shy of his 80th birthday, and is buried at Holy Cross Cemetery in North Arlington, New Jersey.

His grandson is Rick Porcello, former Cy Young Award winner.
