= George Shuba =

American baseball player (1924-2014)

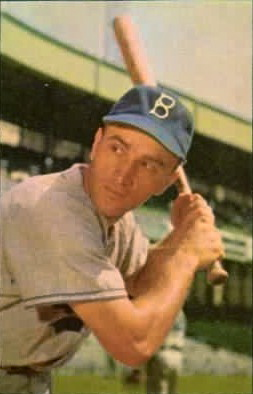
- Outfielder
- Born: December 13, 1924; Youngstown, Ohio, U.S.
- Died: September 29, 2014 (aged 89); Youngstown, Ohio, U.S.
- Batted: Left Threw: Right

MLB debut
- July 2, 1948, for the Brooklyn Dodgers

Last MLB appearance
- September 25, 1955, for the Brooklyn Dodgers

MLB statistics
- Batting average: .259
- Home runs: 24
- Runs batted in: 125
- Stats at Baseball Reference

Teams
- Brooklyn Dodgers (1948–1955)

Career highlights and awards
- World Series champion (1955)

George Thomas Shuba (December 13, 1924 – September 29, 2014) was an American professional baseball utility outfielder and left-handed pinch hitter in Major League Baseball who played seven seasons for the Brooklyn Dodgers. His seven seasons included three World Series as well as a World Series championship in 1955. He was the first National League player to hit a pinch-hit home run in a World Series game.

Shuba is often remembered for his symbolic role in breaking down Major League Baseball's tenacious "color barrier". While playing for the AAA Montreal Royals in 1946, Shuba offered a congratulatory handshake to teammate Jackie Robinson, who went on to become the first African American to play in a major league game since the late 19th century. The moment was captured in a well-known photograph dubbed A Handshake for the Century for featuring the first interracial handshake in a professional baseball game.

In 1972, Shuba's major league career was featured in a chapter of Roger Kahn's The Boys of Summer, a tribute to the 1950s Brooklyn Dodgers. Kahn observed in his book that Shuba earned his nickname, "Shotgun", by "spraying line drives with a swing so compact that it appeared as natural as a smile".

== Early life ==
Shuba was born the youngest of 10 children to Slovak immigrants in Youngstown, Ohio, a steel-manufacturing town with a strong tradition of amateur and minor league baseball. His father, Jan Shuba, emigrated from Slovakia (then part of Austria-Hungary) in 1912. Jan Shuba was 45 years old at the time of George's birth, and he did little to encourage his son's interest in sports. As a child, George Shuba attended Holy Name Elementary School, a parochial school on the city's heavily Eastern European west side.

Shuba was an avid baseball player throughout his youth, and he usually served as a second baseman in neighborhood games. In 1943, when he was 17 years old, he participated in a tryout for the Brooklyn Dodgers and eventually signed a contract. As Shuba later recalled, an ear injury sustained while being disciplined by a teacher prevented him from entering the U.S. Army during World War II. He would gain valuable experience playing for minor league clubs throughout the war years.

== Baseball career ==
After signing a contract with the Dodgers, Shuba played for farm teams in New Orleans and Mobile. He later recalled that his father opposed the move, because he "thought I should go and work in the mills like him". Shuba pursued his goal, however, developing his "natural" swing by practicing for hours with a rope that was tied to the ceiling. He made knots in the rope where the strike zone would be and swung a bat at the rope 600 times a day. This rigorously observed ritual prepared Shuba to compete in the major leagues, where his powerful line drives later earned him the nickname, "Shotgun".

=== The Handshake ===
Montreal Royals shortstop Jackie Robinson crosses the plate in Roosevelt Stadium, Jersey City, after hitting his first career home run and is congratulated by teammate George Shuba.

In the mid-1940s, Shuba was recruited by the Montreal Royals, a major farm team for the Brooklyn Dodgers. The New York Times described the historic day:

On the afternoon of April 18, 1946, Robinson became the first black player in modern organized baseball when he made his debut with the Dodgers’ Montreal Royals farm team in their International League opener against the Jersey City Giants. In the third inning, Robinson hit a three-run homer over the left-field fence. When he completed his trip around the bases, Shuba, the Royals’ left fielder and their next batter, shook his hand. Congratulating a home-run hitter was a commonplace ritual, but Shuba's welcome to a smiling Robinson was captured in an Associated Press photograph that has endured as a portrait of racial tolerance.

The moment was described as the "first interracial handshake" in North American baseball's recent history.

On December 3, 2019 it was reported that a 7-foot statue of the handshake would be created and placed in Shuba's hometown, Youngstown, Ohio. The statue, entitled A Handshake for the Century, was unveiled on April 18, 2021, the 75th anniversary of the handshake.

=== Minor Leagues ===
Despite a record that seemed to merit promotion, he spent the 1947 and 1948 baseball seasons with the minor league Mobile Bears. Shuba later told Roger Kahn that in 1947, he hit 21 home runs and knocked in 110 runs. The next year, Shuba worked up a batting average of .389. In response, Dodgers general manager Branch Rickey complained that Shuba's "power fell off", adding that the team needed "someone who can hit them over that short right-field wall in Ebbets Field". Frustrated, Shuba returned to Mobile in the spring of 1948. "What could I say?" Shuba explained in an interview with Kahn. "As long as he could option me, you know, send me down but keep me Dodger property, Rickey would do that so's he could keep some other guy whose option ran out. Property, that's what we were. But how many guys you know ever hit .389 and never got promoted?"

=== The Majors ===
Shuba made his major league debut with the Dodgers on July 2, 1948. At the peak of his playing career, Shuba delivered a pinch-hit homer in the 1953 World Series opener, which the New York Yankees won 9–5. Ultimately, he worked up a career batting average of .259 on 211 hits in 814 trips, with 125 RBIs, 106 runs scored, and 45 doubles and 24 homers. Playing for the Dodgers, Shuba watched as teammate Jackie Robinson won the league's MVP (1949). A recent feature article noted that Shuba's "best year was in 1952 when he batted .305 (78-for-256) with nine homers, 40 RBIs and 40 runs scored". Knee surgery, however, reduced his effectiveness after that season. Shuba played his final game on September 25, 1955. He appeared in the seventh and final game of that year's World Series; he pinch-hit for Don Zimmer in the sixth inning and grounded out for the final out. The Dodgers defeated the Yankees on Johnny Podres' 2–0 shutout for what would be the franchise's only World Championship in its Brooklyn history (the Dodgers would move to Los Angeles after the 1957 season).

== Personal life ==
Shuba remained single during his professional baseball career. Roger Kahn wrote in The Boys of Summer that the young player spent his years with the Dodgers as "a bachelor living alone and apart from the rest of the players". After retiring from Major League Baseball, Shuba returned to Ohio, where he met his future wife. The couple settled in Austintown, a suburb of Youngstown, where Shuba spent 25 years working in the office of the United States Postal Inspection Service. Shuba and his wife, Katherine, who was nine years his junior, raised three children.

Despite the visibility he gained as a professional athlete, Shuba remained deeply connected to his ethnic and religious roots. Kahn recalled that during a visit to the Shuba household in the early 1970s, the ex-ballplayer recited a mealtime prayer in Slovak. Shuba explained to Kahn that his father had recited the prayer before every family meal.

== Retirement ==
Shuba lived in the Youngstown area since his retirement from Major League Baseball in 1955. In the early 1970s, he was interviewed at his Austintown home by Roger Kahn, who was conducting research for The Boys of Summer, a literary tribute to the 1950s Brooklyn Dodgers. Over the years, Shuba received recognition for his symbolic role in promoting interracial harmony in professional baseball. A 2006 article that appeared in the Chicago Tribune noted that he continued to take pride in the photograph of his groundbreaking handshake with teammate Robinson. A copy of the photo hung behind his favorite living room chair.

During a 1996 interview with a Youngstown news reporter, Shuba recalled his impressions of the legendary Robinson: "To me, Jackie was like all the other guys, a player who came to play and we knew he would be a good one, but what me or anyone else at the time didn't know was how good he would be". In a 2007 reference to Robinson's courage and determination, Shuba credited the other player with imparting "a lesson about life that I have never forgotten". That same year, Shuba highlighted the event in his memoir, My Memories as a Brooklyn Dodger, which he co-wrote with Youngstown-area writer Greg Gulas.

On September 18, 2007, Youngstown's Borts Ball Field, a west side recreational spot that Shuba frequented as a child, was renamed as the George "Shotgun" Shuba Field at Borts Park.

Shuba died on September 29, 2014, at the age of 89. He was the last living Brooklyn Dodger who appeared in the final game of the 1955 World Series, the only one won by the Dodgers in their Brooklyn history.
