= Jersey City Police Memorial =

Bronze sculpture in Jersey City, U.S.

Coordinates: 40°43′7″N 74°02′53″W

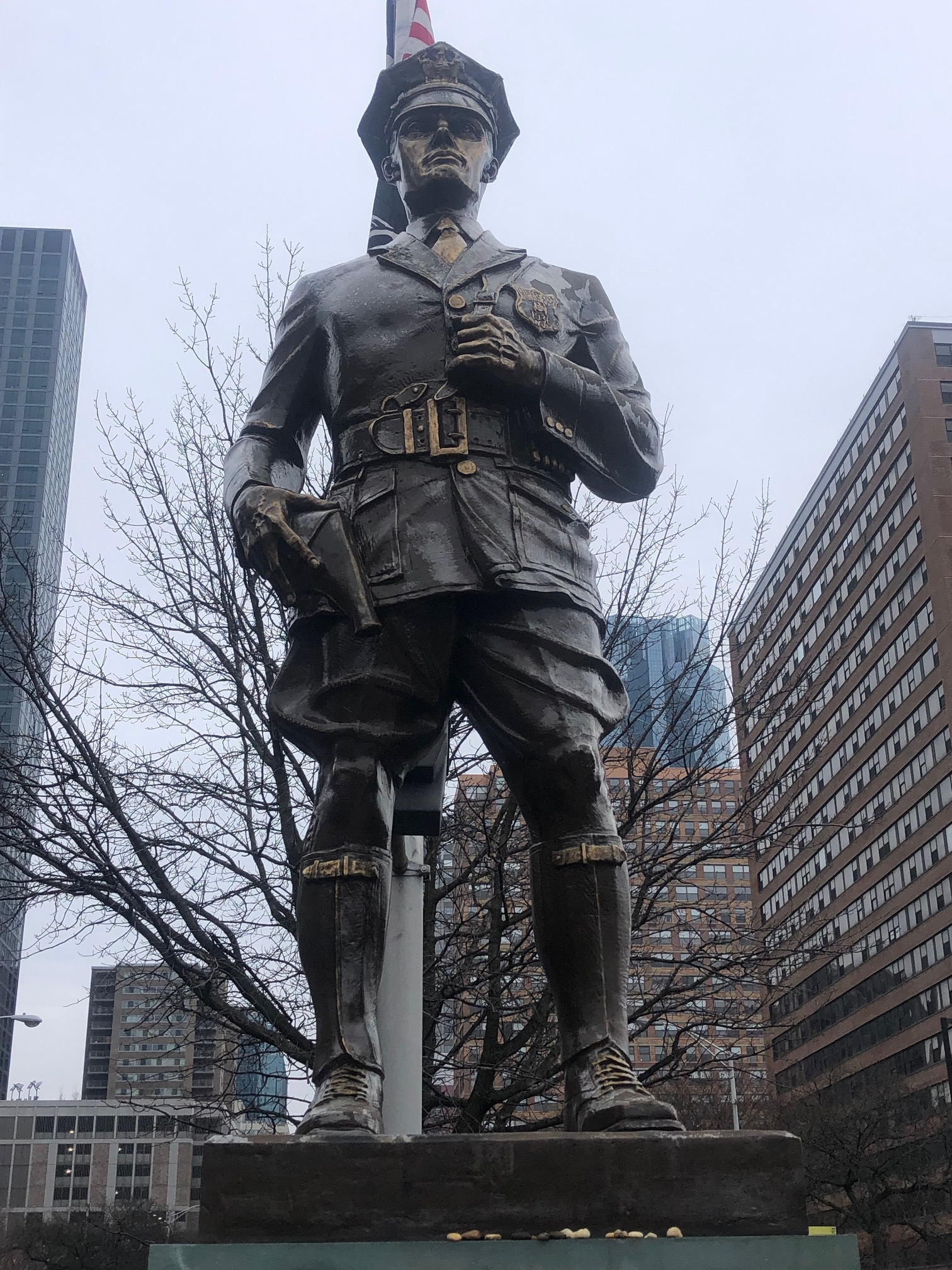
- Artist: Archimedes Giacomantonio
- Year: 1936
- Type: Bronze
- Dimensions: 7 ft (2.1 m) (height)
- Location: City Hall Jersey City, New Jersey

The Jersey City Police Memorial is a tribute to the fallen officers of Jersey City Police Department located on Montgomery Street near City Hall in Jersey City, New Jersey.

== Statue ==
The work was created in 1936 by Archimedes Giacomantonio. The 7 ft (2.1 m) polished bronze and iron statue depicts a police office standing in uniform with his right hand on his holster and his left holding his jacket lapel. The figure is a composite of two Jersey City officers who modelled for the artist.

== Bayview Cemetery ==
The work was originally installed in Bayview – New York Bay Cemetery in 1936 in a dedication ceremony led by Mayor of Jersey City Frank Hague. A granite cube 4 feet square pedestal is inscribed "IN MEMORY OF THE DECEASED MEMBERS OF THE JERSEY CITY POLICE DEPARTMENT ERECTED BY THEIR COMRADES 1936 FRANK HAGUE MAYOR THOMAS J. WOLFE DIRECTOR OF PUBLIC SAFETY".

In 1961 the statue was stolen and retrieved. In 1975, the memorial was again stolen. It was cut into pieces and almost sold for scrap. The pieces were found in various locations.

== City Hall ==
The statue was restored by the original artist and relocated to new pedestal built at new site at the rear side of Jersey City City Hall and rededicated in 1976. On the mortared stone pedestal: "IN MEMORY OF DECEASED MEMBERS OF THE JERSEY CITY POLICE".

== See also ==
- List of public art in Jersey City, New Jersey
