= Charles N. Lowrie =

American landscape architect

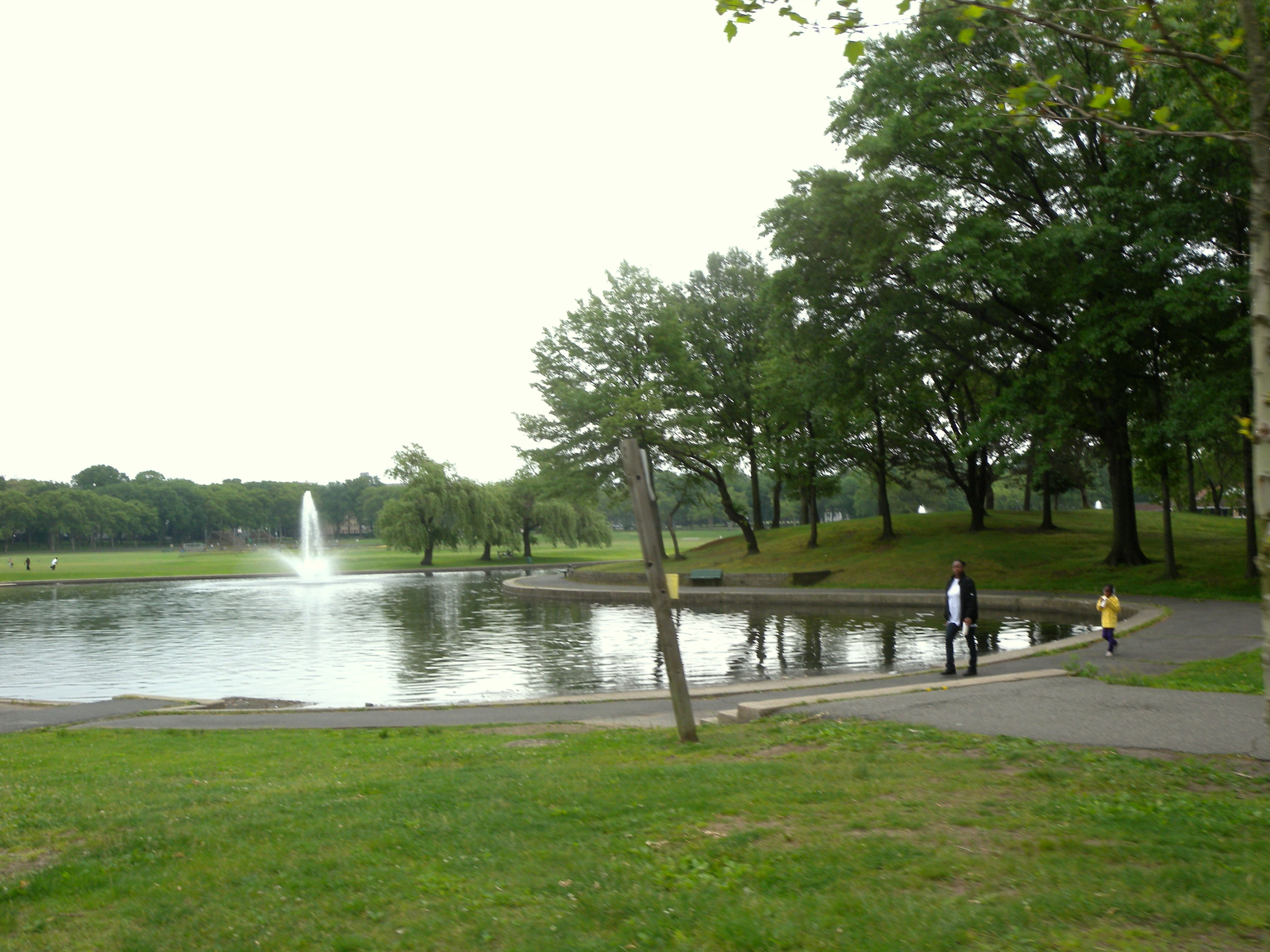
Lincoln Park

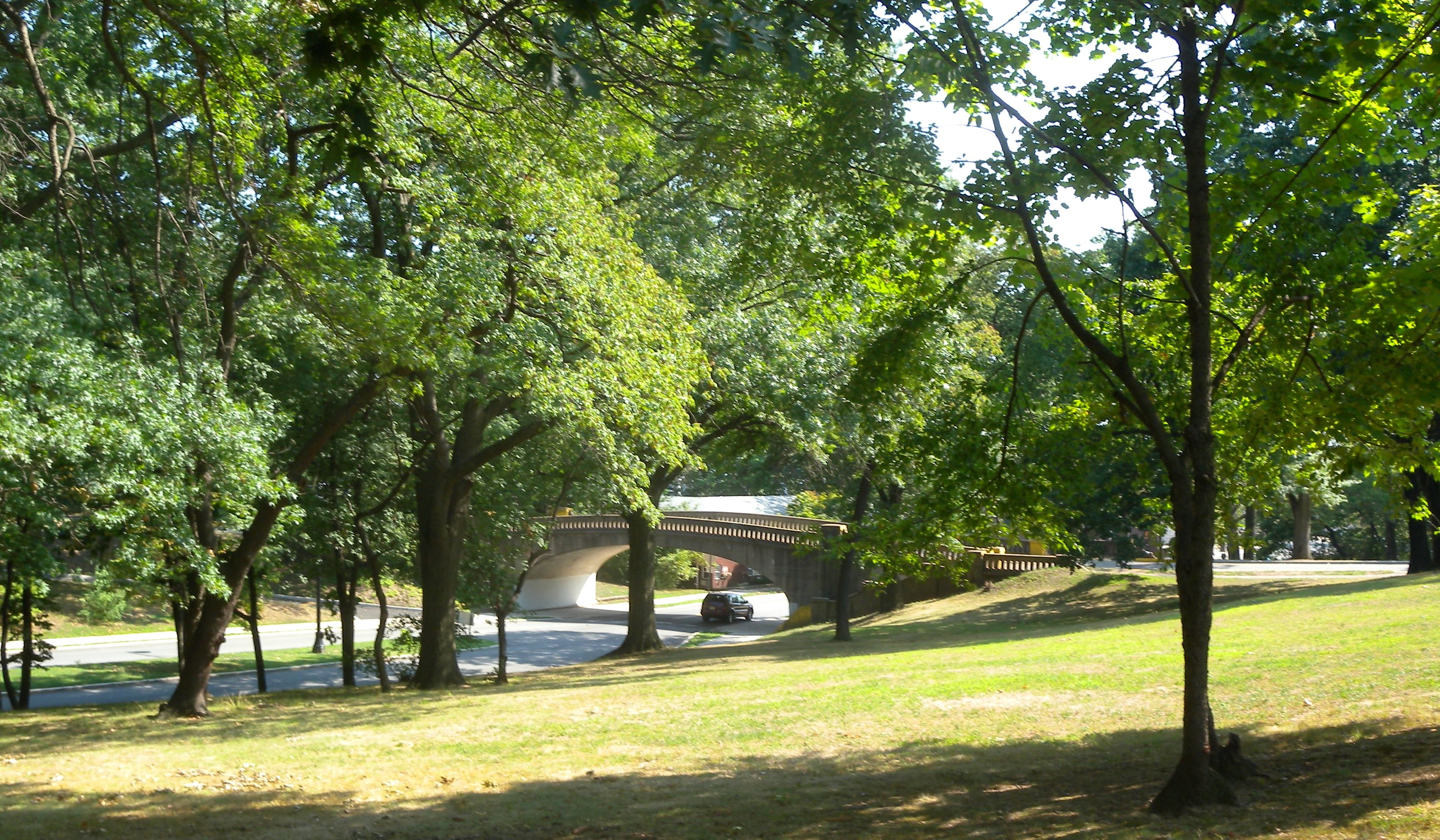
West Hudson Park

Charles Nassau Lowrie (April 8, 1869 – September 18, 1939) was an American landscape architect and designer. He was one of eleven founding members of the American Society of Landscape Architects in 1899, president from 1909 to 1911, and was active in the City Beautiful Movement.

== Biography ==
Born in Warriors Mark, Huntingdon County, Pennsylvania, he graduated from Yale College's Sheffield Scientific School in 1891.

Lowrie was the landscape architect for the Hudson County, New Jersey Park Commission for thirty years and designed several parks for the county's park system, including Lincoln Park and Pershing Field in Jersey City, Stephen R. Gregg Hudson County Park in Bayonne, Columbus Park in Hoboken and West Hudson Park in Harrison.

He was a member of the New York's Municipal Art Society. He was in charge of landscaping Red Hook Houses, a housing project in Brooklyn. He was on the 1939 New York World's Fair staff.

Lowrie designed the 20th-century master plan for University of Connecticut's campus in Storrs, Connecticut. He made the first master plan developed for University Park, Pennsylvania State University. He was also involved in city planning for Columbus, Ohio Lowrie made preliminary plans for a competition for a Roosevelt Memorial in Washington, DC, which was never built.

In 1917, Lowrie was hired by William and Gertrude Ritter to prepare a landscape plan for the grounds of their new home in Manchester, Vermont. Known as "Yester House," the property is now home to the Southern Vermont Arts Center.

Some of his professional papers and architectural plans are archived at Cornell.

He died in New York and was buried in Lawrenceville, New Jersey.
