= Saratoga Park =

Public park in Brooklyn, New York

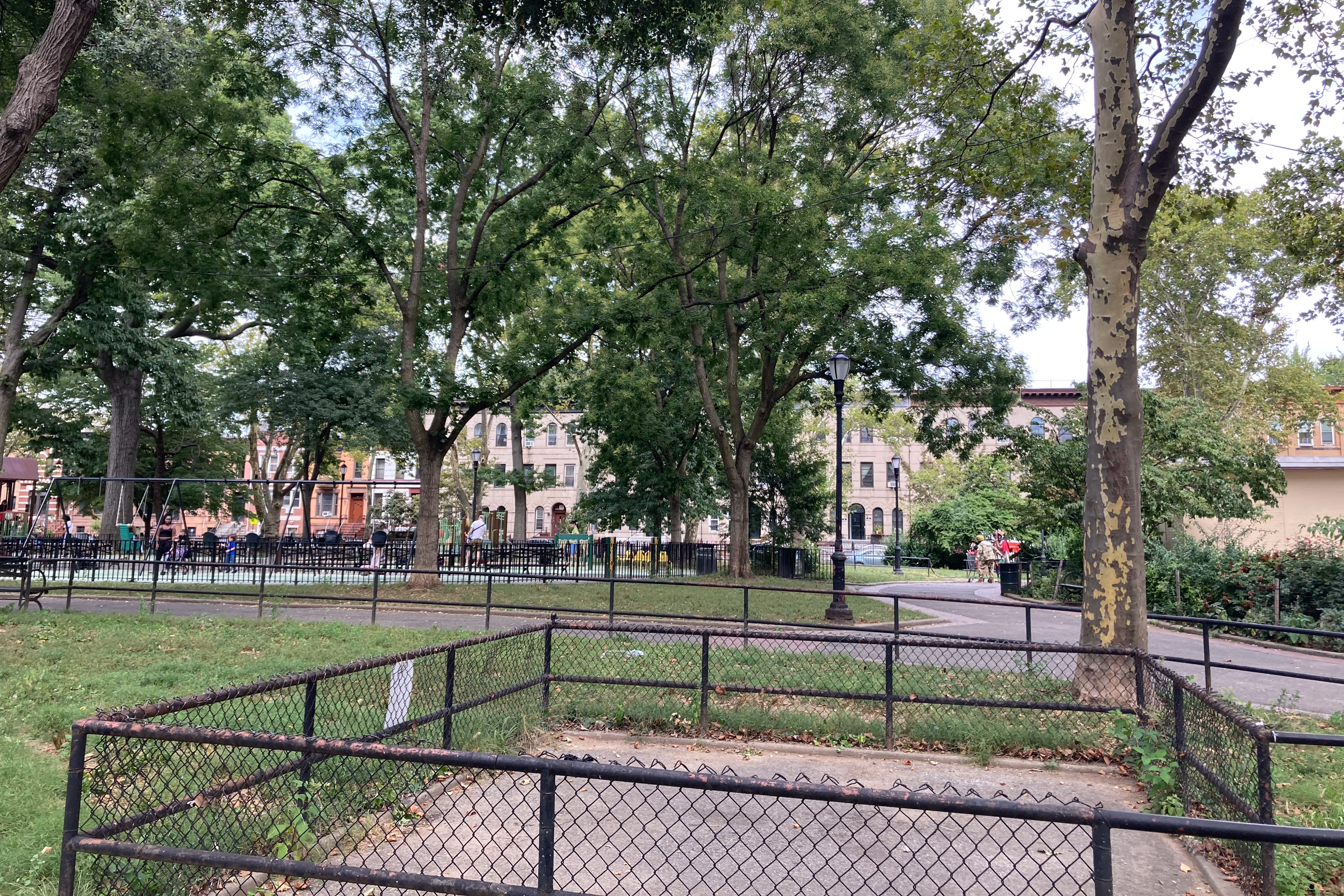
- Saratoga Park in 2025
- Interactive map of Saratoga Park
- Location: Bedford–Stuyvesant, Brooklyn
- Coordinates: 40.685°N 73.919°W
- Area: 3.21 acres (1.30 ha)
- Operator: New York City Department of Parks and Recreation

Saratoga Park is a public park in Bedford–Stuyvesant, Brooklyn. It is bordered by Halsey Street, Saratoga Avenue, Macon Street, and Howard Avenue.

== History ==
Prior to becoming a park the land was used to host travelling circuses. In 1896 it was purchased by the City of Brooklyn to convert into a park. After the park was created, the circus and event field moved just east across Saratoga Avenue and continued operating until 1912, after which the block was redeveloped with three entertainment venues including the Broadway Arena, Halsey Theater and Arcadia Dance Hall.

== War Memorial ==
In 1920, local Citizen's Memorial Committees commissioned a memorial to honor those from the neighborhood who lost their lives in World War I. The monument was dedicated on September 11, 1921. The memorial consisted of two scrolls listing the 104 men who died in the war, and, notably, the first woman Marine buried with full military honors. Between the scrolls stood a bronze figure of Columbia sculpted by James Novelli and cast by Roman Bronze Works.

In the late 20th century, the monument fell into disrepair; its plaques were stolen in 1970. Thirty years later, in 2000, the main statue was also stolen. The investigation that followed retrieved pieces of the statue from a scrapyard.

After the pedestal stood empty for more than ten years, discretionary funding was allocated by Councilmember Darlene Mealy to recreate the monument from archival photos and the recovered pieces of the original monument. On September 10, 2014, the monument was rededicated at a ceremony attended by Mealy and Eric Adams.
