= Washington Park (Hudson County) =

Park in New Jersey, United States

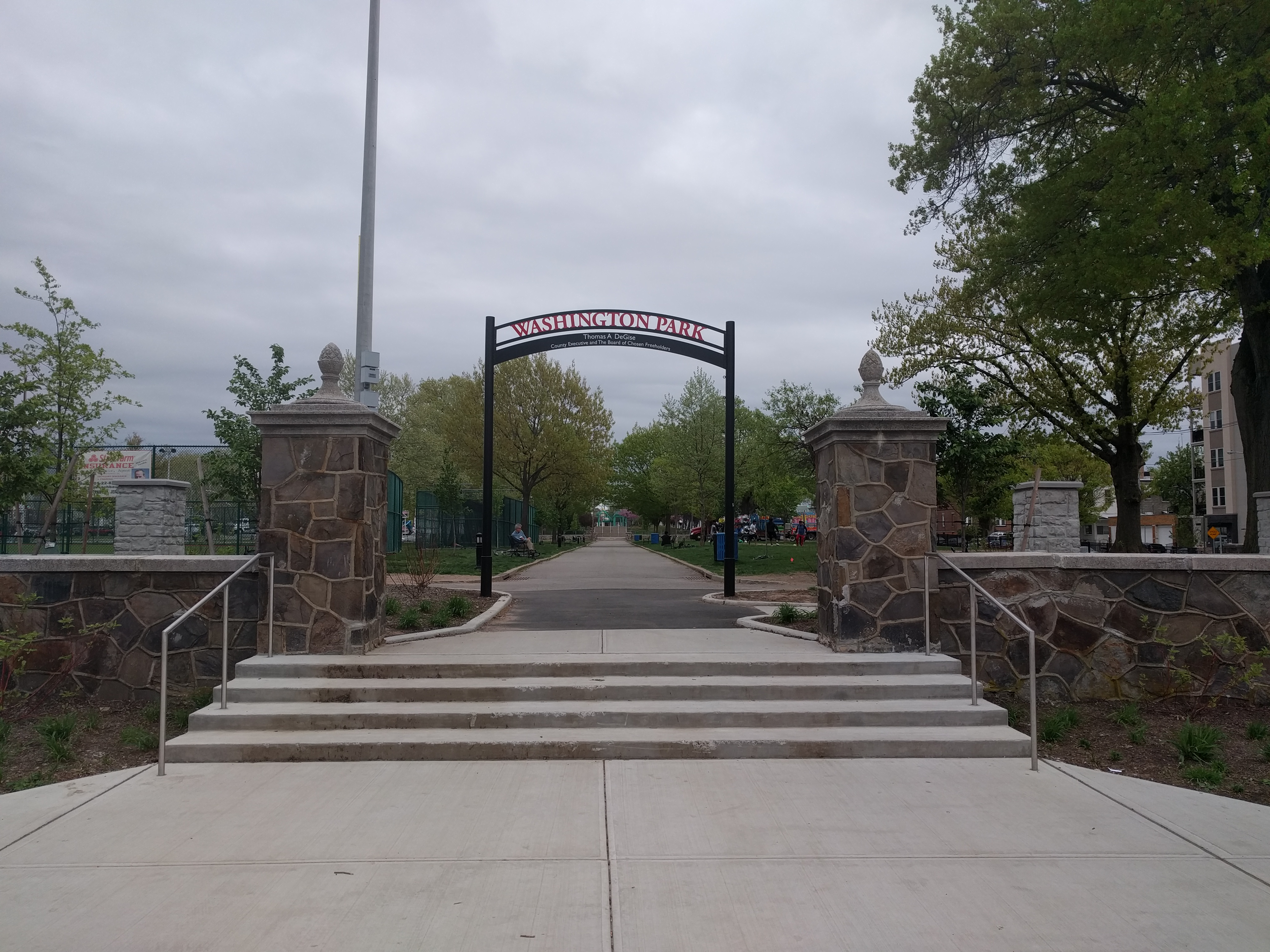

- Location within Hudson County, New Jersey
- Location: Jersey City and Union City, New Jersey
- Coordinates: 40.753°N 74.044°W
- Area: 21 acres (8.5 ha)
- Opened: 1917
- Operator: Hudson County Park System

Washington Park is part of the Hudson County Park System in Hudson County, New Jersey. It straddles the border of Union City and the Heights neighborhood of Jersey City. Spread over 21 acres (8.5 ha), it comprises 4 sections traversed by various streets, including Paterson Plank Road (the city line) and Palisade Avenue. Land for the park was acquired in 1917, which was further developed during the Works Progress Administration in the 1930s.

== History ==
The Suckleys owned the land on which the park was built for generations. Largely a flat expanse of dirt, it came to be used to host visiting carnivals, circuses, and Wild West shows, including Buffalo Bill's Wild West show, performed there in 1908, when the plot was called the North Street Grounds.

On January 12, 1909, a joint committee was formed to petition the relevant government agencies, such as the Hudson County Board of Chosen Freeholders, for funds to purchase the Suckley property and other smaller plots. Assemblyman William R. Davidson argued at the committee's first meeting that the 14th Street viaduct being constructed, which the park site overlooked, would be a significant transportation corridor that would increase property values. The Suckley Park Association was founded that same year. Its co-founder and first president was doctor and civic leader Ulamor Allen, who has been called the Father of Washington Park. On June 8, 1909, Allen addressed the Hudson County Park Commission to argue for the park, joining with others who lobbied for the purchase the Curries Woods site for another county park, which would straddle the Bayonne-Jersey City border. The County Park Commission agreed that both "border line" parks deserved to be developed, though bureaucratic red tape would delay the endeavour for years. In July 1914, the Suckley Park Association asked the Park Commission to requisition the Board of Freeholders for $500,000 for the park. The following month, the commissioners passed a resolution asking the Freeholders to borrow that money. In 1917 the county reached an agreement to purchase the land for $562,435.

The park took its current shape in the 1930s, partially as a result of the input of the Works Progress Administration.

At one point the park had pool. It was closed in 1970 and later filled in.

Wave, a sculpture by Chakaia Booker, was placed in the park in 2008. Commissioned by the county, the brushed stainless steel work is 14 feet (4.3 m) high and 35 feet (11 m) wide.

== See also ==
- List of public art in Jersey City, New Jersey
