= La Vela di Colombo =

Coordinates: 40°42′21″N 74°2′36″W

- Year: 1992 (created); 1998 (installed)
- Dimensions: 6 metres (20 ft) (height)
- Location: Liberty State Park Jersey City, New Jersey

La Vela di Colombo, or the Sail of Columbus, is a monument located along the Hudson River Waterfront Walkway at Liberty State Park in Jersey City, New Jersey. It commemorates the 500th anniversary of the journey of Christopher Columbus to America in 1492, the role of Genoa, Italy in the Age of Discovery, and Italian immigration to the Port of New York and New Jersey.

The 6 meter (20 foot) tall bronze work weighing 240 hundredweight was designed by Italian sculptor Gino Gianetti. The plaza which creates the setting for the statue was designed by the RBA Group. The Sail of Columbus is set atop four bronze mooring posts mounted on a stone base in the shape of a ship. The waterfront side of the sail depicts scenes of the explorer's travels. The inland side includes a scene with Columbus at the helm of his ship, the Santa Maria.

The statue is a gift from the Italian government and the City of Genoa. It was originally transported to the United States in 1992, but a place to install it was not decided until 1998, when the National Italian-American Foundation and the Columbus Citizens Foundation dedicated the sculpture at its permanent location.

A smaller version of the work can be found at Genoa Cristoforo Colombo Airport in Genoa, Italy.

A separate stone plaque at the foot of the sculpture entitled Bridge of Nations is inscribed:

A BRIDGE TO A NEW WORLD
FOUNDED BY THE IMAGINATION OF A DREAMER
FORGED WITH COURAGE - TRAVERSED BY GREATNESS
AN EVERLASTING CONNECTION BETWEEN OUR NATIONS
ITALY AND AMERICA - BRETHREN TOGETHER
MAY WE FOREVER SAIL

== See also ==
- List of monuments and memorials to Christopher Columbus
- List of public art in Jersey City, New Jersey
