= Antonio Salemme =

American sculptor (1892–1995)

- Born: November 2, 1892; Gaeta, Italy
- Died: May 2, 1995 (aged 102) (possibly May 1, or May 5); Williams Township, Pennsylvania, U.S.
- Occupations: American sculptor and painter
- Relatives: Attilio Salemme (step-brother)

Antonio Salemme (November 2, 1892 − May 1995) was an Italian-born American sculptor and painter. His work included sculpted portraits of John F. Kennedy, Dwight D. Eisenhower, Albert Einstein, Paul Robeson, Ethel Waters, and classical nudes. He was an American Classicist. In both painting and sculpture he advanced Post-Impressionism and Modernism into the late 20th century. His statements on the nature of style illuminated the difference between originality and stylization.

== Early life and education ==
Antonio Salemme was born on November 2, 1892, in Gaeta, Italy. Following the death of his mother in 1904, he emigrated to Boston with his father Nicola Vincenzo Salemme, where he began studying art at the age of 14. His step-brother was painter and sculptor Attilio Salemme (1911–1955), and his step sister-in-law was painter Lucia Autorino Salemme (c. 1919–2010).

In 1912, a benefactor assisted him in returning to Italy to study sculpture in Rome.

== Career ==
=== World War I and New York City ===
After studying in Boston and Rome, Salemme served in the Italian Army during World War I.

After the war's conclusion, Salemme returned to the United States, where he settled in New York City and became involved in the Greenwich Village cultural scene of the 1920s and 1930s.

=== Sculpture and portraits ===
In 1924, he attended a performance of The Emperor Jones, starring Paul Robeson. Salemme subsequently asked the actor to model for him. The finished work, "Negro Spiritual", was displayed at the Brooklyn Museum and other fine art institutions. The sculpture later voyaged to a foundry in France to be cast in bronze, but was lost during World War II.

Three of his portraits, those of Robeson, Ethel Waters, and Arctic explorer Vilhjalmur Stefansson, are on display at the National Portrait Gallery in Washington, D.C. Salemme's portrait of John F. Kennedy is on display at the John F. Kennedy Presidential Library and Museum in Boston. Salemme's life-size nude of Paul Robeson in 1926, Negro Spiritual, was exhibited to acclaim in New York City, Chicago, San Francisco, and Paris, and became a cause celebré when it was banned from an exhibition in Philadelphia in 1930.

In the 1930s, Salemme worked as a director in the Works Progress Administration. He was the recipient of two Guggenheim Fellowships in 1932 and 1936. In the 1940s, he became increasingly interested in painting, which he had studied as a teenager. Salemme's annual summer visits to Rockport, Massachusetts resulted in several Post-Impressionist-inspired sea and landscapes.

After a 43-year career in New York City, Salemme and his wife Martha returned to the Lehigh Valley region of eastern Pennsylvania in 1962. In the 1980s, he and his wife Martha set up the Antonio Salemme Foundation in Allentown, Pennsylvania, as an initial step towards the founding of a museum to permanently house the artist's work.

In 2013, an Italian historical society published a selection of Salemme's letters and photographs from his military service in World War I. The artist's work was the subject of a retrospective exhibition at the Sigal Museum in Easton, Pennsylvania in 2014.

Working from memory and imagination, and inspired by Hindu philosophy and his devoted practice of Zen Buddhist meditation, Salemme painted and sculpted almost up until his death at age 102.

== Death ==
Salemme died in May 1995, in Williams Township, Pennsylvania at the age of 102.
