= Chakaia Booker =

American sculptor (born 1953)

- Born: 1953 (age 72–73); Newark, New Jersey, U.S.
- Education: Rutgers University, City College of New York
- Known for: Sculpture
- Website: https://chakaiabooker.com/

Chakaia Booker (born 1953) is an American sculptor known for creating monumental, abstract works for both the gallery and outdoor public spaces. Booker’s works are contained in more than 40 public collections and have been exhibited across the United States, Europe, Africa, and Asia. Booker was included in the 2000 Whitney Biennial, received a Guggenheim Fellowship in 2005, and an American Academy of Arts and Letters Award for Art in 2001. Booker has lived and worked in New York City’s East Village since the early 1980s and maintains a production studio in Allentown, Pennsylvania.

Booker is best known for her innovative and signature use of recycled rubber tires, her primary sculptural material. Rubber has provided Booker with the ability to work in a modular format at a monumental scale while maintaining a fluid movement and gestural feel. Throughout her career, Booker has consistently used stainless steel and fabric to create sculptural works in addition to rubber tires.

In 2009, Booker began an in depth exploration of printmaking creating a significant body of graphic works, largely focused on the process of chine collé. Booker’s approach to printmaking processes is reminiscent of her modular working methods in sculpture. Printmaking has become a regular part of Booker’s artistic output, and as with her use of rubber, Booker has invented unique ways of manipulating materials and processes.

== Early life and education ==
Booker was born in 1953 in Newark, New Jersey. She was raised in neighboring East Orange, New Jersey, where she learned to sew from her grandmother, aunt, and sister. Fixing, repairing, and manipulating materials early in life was foundational to Booker’s later approach to wearable art, ceramics, and sculpture, specifically with the use of pattern, repetition, and modular construction.

Booker received a BA in sociology from Rutgers University in 1976 and an MFA from the City College of New York in 1993. She has studied African dance, ceramics, weaving, basketry, and tai chi, all of which have influenced her art.

She has lived and worked in New York City’s East Village since the early 1980s. In the 1990s, she began working with discarded construction materials and rubber tires, which evolved into her artistic style. She maintains a production studio in Allentown, Pennsylvania for fabrication of large-scale and public works. Booker has served on the boards of the International Sculpture Center and Socrates Sculpture Park.

== Career ==
Raw Attraction (2001) at the Metropolitan Museum of Art in 2022

Beginning in the 1980s, Booker created wearable sculptures which she could place herself inside and utilize as clothing. "The wearable garment sculpture was about getting energy and feeling from a desired design." In the early 1990s, Booker began to create large outdoor sculptures from discarded materials found at construction sites, including rubber tires, a medium in which she continues to work. The various tire tread patterns, colors, and widths create a palette for Booker similar to the palette of a painter. Booker's use of tires suggests a range of aesthetic, political, cultural, and economic concerns. They may be considered a reference to the urban landscape of Northern New Jersey or a reminder how modes of transportation have changed since the industrial age. The tire sculptures may also be considered to address African American identity: their varying pigments and textures can be interpreted as a representation of the range of African American skin tones, and their resiliency has been viewed as "a compelling metaphor of African American survival in the modern world." Tire tread patterns in her work may also refer to elements of African culture, including scarification, body painting, and traditional textiles.

Booker's work also deals with themes of class, labor, sustainability, and gender. Booker's "Echoes in Black (Industrial Cicatrization)" from the 2000 Whitney Biennial deals with the emotional and physical scarification that people experience in life. Her piece "No More Milk and Cookies" from 2003 "questions our commercially driven society and what happens when consumption is prohibited." In "The Urgency and Resonance of Chakaia Booker," “For example, the piece “It’s So Hard To Be Green” (2000), [composed] of rubber and wood, has a riot of textures and tendrils, knots and curls,” raises value to what can be implied as how hard sustainability is to maintain. Similarly, her piece “Wonder” is one of many pieces that work to represent sustainability in which speaks to the environment and ecology importance and intention Booker showcases to her audience, from "Artist Chakaia Booker Gives Tires a Powerful Retread." Booker didn't stop at only recycling tires from her hometown and what she could find but also began sourcing them straight out of businesses that had no use for used old tires, this includes “Michelin, which sends her used tires from race cars and motorcycles” as mentioned in "For Chakaia Booker, Whose Medium Is Tires, the Art Is in the Journey." Aruna D’Souza, on "How Artist Chakaia Booker Turns Car Tires into Transcendence," does a good job illustrating the connection between recycled tires that were then used to create Booker's installations. Unsurprisingly, tires also relate to back-bending automobile labor and come full circle regarding how unsustainable tires become after use. For example, Booker's 2001 piece "Wench (Wrench) III" is a surrealistic sculpture that subverts a very masculine mechanic's wrench into a feminine feather boa. The piece "Spirit Hunter" is reminiscent of images of life and death, as well as a feminist approach to birth and sexuality.

== Works and exhibits ==
Chakaia Booker currently works and resides in New York City. Her work is part of the permanent collection at the Metropolitan Museum of Art, Cornell University's Johnson Museum of Art, The Max Protetch and June Kelly galleries in New York, and others. She has participated in both group and solo exhibitions in such places as the Neuberger Museum of Art, the Akron Museum of Art, Marlborough gallery, the Sandler Hudson Gallery in Atlanta, Georgia, and the PS 1 Contemporary Art Center in Queens, as well as in the "Twentieth Century American Sculpture" exhibition held at the White House in 1996.

On June 22, 2008, Booker unveiled "Chaikaia Booker: Mass Transit" in Indianapolis, Indiana. This public art exhibition featured 10 sculptures "created by the artist following her visit to Indianapolis and her researching of the city's history and heritage."

The National Museum of Women in the Arts has exhibited her works in The New York Avenue Sculpture Project (2012), FOREFRONT: Chakaia Booker (2006), and Reaching for the Stars through Art (1998). The Georgia Museum of Art in Athens, GA also exhibited her work in an exhibition entitled Defiant Beauty, which was on display from April 2012 – 2013. Several of her works were also on display in New York City's Garment District from June–November 2014 and 2024.

Booker is one of nine contemporary artists with work on display at the Renwick Gallery's Wonder Gallery in the Smithsonian American Art Museum in Washington D.C. The sculpture on display was "It's So Hard to be Green," which was also exhibited at the 2000 Whitney Museum Biennial. Booker's sculpture Position Preferred was on view at the McNay Art Museum in 2020.

In May 2021, her exhibition "Chakaia Booker: The Observance" went on display at the Institute of Contemporary Art in Miami. In 2021, Oklahoma Contemporary displayed her Shaved Portions exhibit.

In 2025-2026, her exhibition "Chakaia Booker: Treading New Ground" went on display at the National Gallery of Art in Washington, D.C.

On October 26-27, 2026, her latest monumental installation will take place in Akron, Ohio often called "The Rubber Capital of the World" for its rapid industrial growth, particularly in the rubber sector, in the first half of the 20th century. https://www.beaconjournal.com/story/entertainment/arts/2026/10/23/sculpture-made-from-recycled-racing-tires-to-grace-lock-3/92287832007/?gnt-cfr=1&gca-cat=p&gca-uir=true&gca-epti=z112716p001550c001550e002710v112716d--35--b--35--&gca-ft=125&gca-ds=sophi She mounted a solo exhibition at the Akron Art Museum https://akronartmuseum.org/ in 2000, and is returning to the city in 2026 to celebrate the installation of a permanent, 17-foot sculpture made from donated Goodyear Eagle F1 racing tires and stainless steel. https://www.downtownakron.com/newsitem/internationally-acclaimed-sculptor-chakaia-booker-to-create-monumental-sculpture-for-akrons-lock-3

== Notable works in public collections ==
- Shhh (1992), Pyramid Hill Sculpture Park and Museum, Hamilton, Ohio
- Mother and Child (1994), Zimmerli Art Museum at Rutgers University, New Brunswick, New Jersey
- Blue Bell (1998), Allen Memorial Art Museum, Oberlin, Ohio
- Egress (c. 2000), National Gallery of Art, Washington, D.C.
- Sweet Dreams (2000), Brooklyn Museum, New York
- When Thoughts Collide (2000), Herbert F. Johnson Museum of Art, Ithaca, New York
- Acid Rain (2001), National Museum of Women in the Arts, Washington, D.C.
- El Gato (2001), Kemper Museum of Contemporary Art, Kansas City, Missouri
- India Blue (2001), Flint Institute of Arts, Michigan
- It's Like This (2001), Birmingham Museum of Art, Alabama
- Little Red Riding Hood (2001), Philander Smith College, Little Rock, Arkansas
- Raw Attraction (2001), Metropolitan Museum of Art, New York
- Urban Butterfly (2001), Davis Museum at Wellesley College, Wellesley, Massachusetts
- Urban Mask (2001), National Museum of African American History and Culture, Smithsonian Institution. Washington, D.C.
- Untitled (2002), Memphis Brooks Museum of Art, Memphis, Tennessee
- A Moment in Time (2004), Storm King Art Center, New Windsor, New York
- Echoing Factors (2004), Brooklyn College Library, City University of New York
- Quality Time (2004), Rhode Island School of Design Museum, Providence; Whitney Museum, New York; and Yale University Art Gallery, New Haven, Connecticut
- Rendezvous (2004), Frederik Meijer Gardens and Sculpture Park, Grand Rapids, Michigan
- Urban Excursion (2004), Frederik Meijer Gardens and Sculpture Park, Grand Rapids, Michigan
- Position Preferred (2006), McNay Art Museum, San Antonio
- Remembering Columbia (2006), NASA Art Program, National Aeronautics and Space Administration, Washington, D.C.
- Four Twenty One (2010), David C. Driskell Center, University of Maryland, College Park; and Yale University Art Gallery, New Haven, Connecticut
- Untitled (2011), Davis Museum at Wellesley College, Wellesley, Massachusetts; and Library of Congress, Washington, D.C.
- The Liquidity of Legacy (2016), National Museum of African American History and Culture, Smithsonian Institution, Washington, D.C.

== Awards, commissions, and residencies ==
=== Selected awards and residencies ===
- Merit Award in Public Art, Keep Indianapolis Beautiful, Indianapolis, 2008
- Fellowship for Fine Arts, John Simon Guggenheim Memorial Foundation, New York City, 2005
- Design Award, Art Commission of the City of New York, New York City, 2005
- Grant, Pollock-Krasner Foundation, New York City, 2002
- Arts and Letters Award, Academy of Arts and Letters, New York City, 2001
- Grant, Anonymous Was A Woman Award, New York City, 2000
- Inclusion in the Whitney Biennial, Whitney Museum of American Art, New York City, 2000
- Award, Johnnie L. Cochran, Jr. Art Fund, New York City, 1999
- Gregory Millard Fellow: Sculpture, New York Foundation for the Arts, New York City, 1997
- The Joan Mitchell Foundation, Painters and Sculptors Grant, New York City, 1995
- Artist-in-Residence, The Studio Museum in Harlem, New York City, 1995
- Commission, NASA Art Program, National Museum of Women in the Arts, Washington, D.C., 1994
- Therese Ralston McCabe Connor Award, City College of New York, New York City, 1992
- Grant, Artists Space, New York City, 1988

=== Selected commissions ===
- Wave, Washington Park, Hudson County, New Jersey, 2008
- National Museum of African American History and Culture, Washington, D.C., 2016
- Millennium Park, Chicago, 2016
- Renwick Gallery, Washington, D.C., 2015
- Weeksville Heritage Center, Brooklyn, 2013
