= Lucia Autorino Salemme =

American artist (c. 1919–2010)

- Born: Lucia Autorino c. 1919; New York City, U.S.
- Died: July 2, 2010; New York City, U.S.
- Burial place: Holy Cross Cemetery, North Arlington, New Jersey, U.S.
- Other names: Lucia Salemme, Lucia A. Salemme
- Education: Art Students League of New York, National Academy of Design
- Occupations: Visual artist, teacher, author
- Spouse: Attilio Salemme (m. 1943–1955; his death)
- Children: 2

Lucia "Lucy" Autorino Salemme (née Lucia Autorino; c. 1919 – July 2, 2010) was an American visual artist, teacher, and author. She was known for her abstract paintings.

== Life and career ==
Salemme attended classes the Art Students League of New York, and the National Academy of Design. Gustavo Othello Cenci was her teacher.

In her early career she worked for the Federal Art Project. Her artwork is included in the collections of the Whitney Museum of American Art, National Gallery of Art in Washington, D.C., and the Metropolitan Museum of Art.

She was married to Italian-American painter Attilio Salemme (1911–1955). She had two sons. Her step brother-in-law was sculptor and painter Antonio Salemme.

Salemme taught painting at the Art Students League of New York, and New York University.

== Publications ==
- Salemme, Lucia A. (1970). Color Exercises for the Painter. New York City, NY: Watson-Guptill. ISBN 978-0273014270.
- Salemme, Lucia A. (1973). Compositional Exercises for the Painter. New York City, NY: Watson-Guptill. ISBN 978-0823008773.
- Salemme, Lucia A. (1982). The Complete Book of Painting Techniques: Oil, Watercolors, Pastels, Acrylics, Collage, Mixed Media. New York City, NY: Free Press. ISBN 9780029279106.
- Salemme, Lucia A. (1984). Painting Techniques. New York City, NY: Free Press.
- Salemme, Lucia A. (1996). Lucia Autorino Salemme: A Modernist's View of New York City (exhibition catalogue). Lewiston, Maine: Bates College Museum of Art.
- Salemme, Lucia A. (1998). Lucia Autorino Salemme: In Place of this (exhibition catalogue). Southeast Missouri State University.
