= Stephen R. Gregg =

Stephen Raymond Gregg Sr.
- Born: September 1, 1914; New York City, US
- Died: February 4, 2005 (aged 90); Bayonne, New Jersey, US
- Burial place: Holy Cross Cemetery, North Arlington, New Jersey
- Military career
- Allegiance: United States
- Branch: United States Army
- Service years: 1942–1945
- Rank: Second Lieutenant
- Units: 143rd Infantry Regiment, 36th Infantry Division
- Conflicts: World War II
- Awards: Medal of Honor; Silver Star; Bronze Star with cluster Purple Heart with cluster French Croix de Guerre; Combat Infantry Badge

Stephen Raymond Gregg Sr. (September 1, 1914 – February 4, 2005) was a United States Army soldier and a recipient of the United States military's highest decoration—the Medal of Honor—for his actions in World War II.

== Biography ==
Gregg was drafted into the Army from Bayonne, New Jersey in February 1942, and by August 27, 1944 was serving as a technical sergeant in 143rd Infantry Regiment, 36th Infantry Division. On that day, near Montélimar, France, he provided covering fire for a combat medic who was evacuating wounded men to safety. Gregg was briefly captured by German soldiers, but managed to escape and returned to the fight. The next day, he directed the fire of his mortar section until communications were disabled. Upon learning that the mortar position had been captured and was being used to fire on his own company, he attacked and re-took the mortars. Gregg was subsequently promoted to second lieutenant and, on April 17, 1945, was presented with the Medal of Honor by Lt. Gen. Alexander M. Patch Jr., Commanding General of the U.S. 7th Army. He is one of 16 New Jersey and one of two Bayonne residents to receive the Medal of Honor from action taken in World War II.

Gregg returned to Bayonne in 1945 and was greeted with a parade attended by 50,000 people, during which he met his future wife, Irene Zawalick, whom he married in 1947. He went to work for the Hudson's County Sheriff's Department and retired as chief of court officers in 1996, after fifty one years of service. He remained very social with his fellow Medal of Honor recipients attending dinners and fundraisers. In 1995 Hudson County, New Jersey re-name Bayonne Park the Stephen R. Gregg Park. It is part of the Hudson County Park System and is located on Kennedy Boulevard and Newark Bay in Bayonne.

He died in 2005 at age 90 and was buried in Holy Cross Cemetery, North Arlington, New Jersey. He was survived by his son, Stephen Gregg Jr., his daughter, Susan Gregg, and two grandsons, Stephen Gregg III and Adam Gregg.

On July 15, 2021, a bronze statue of Gregg was unveiled in Bayonne in the park that bears his name.

== Medal of Honor citation ==
General Orders: War Department, General Orders No. 31 (April 17, 1945)
Action Date: 27-Aug-44
Service: Army
Rank: Second Lieutenant
Company: Company L
Regiment: 143d Infantry Regiment
Division: 36th Infantry Division

The President of the United States of America, in the name of Congress, takes pleasure in presenting the Medal of Honor to Second Lieutenant (Infantry), [then Technical Sergeant] Stephen Raymond Gregg, United States Army, for conspicuous gallantry and intrepidity at risk of life above and beyond the call of duty on 27 August 1944, while serving with Company L, 143d Infantry Regiment, 36th Infantry Division, in action in the vicinity of Montelimar, France. As his platoon advanced upon the enemy positions; the leading scout was fired upon and Second Lieutenant Gregg immediately put his machineguns into action to cover the advance of the riflemen. The Germans, who were at close range, threw hand grenades at the riflemen, killing some and wounding seven. Each time a medical aid man attempted to reach the wounded, the Germans fired at him. Realizing the seriousness of the situation, Second Lieutenant Gregg took one of the light .30-caliber machineguns, and firing from the hip, started boldly up the hill with the medical aid man following him. Although the enemy was throwing hand grenades at him, Second Lieutenant Gregg remained and fired into the enemy positions while the medical aid man removed the seven wounded men to safety. When Second Lieutenant Gregg had expended all his ammunition, he was covered by four Germans who ordered him to surrender. Since the attention of most of the Germans had been diverted by watching this action, friendly riflemen were able to maneuver into firing positions. One, seeing Second Lieutenant Gregg's situation, opened fire on his captors. The four Germans hit the ground and thereupon Second Lieutenant Gregg recovered a machine pistol from one of the Germans and managed to escape to his other machinegun positions. He manned a gun, firing at his captors, killed one of them and wounded the other. This action so discouraged the Germans that the platoon was able to continue its advance up the hill to achieve its objective. The following morning, just prior to daybreak, the Germans launched a strong attack, supported by tanks, in an attempt to drive Company L from the hill. As these tanks moved along the valley and their foot troops advanced up the hill, Second Lieutenant Gregg immediately ordered his mortars into action. During the day by careful observation, he was able to direct effective fire on the enemy, inflicting heavy casualties. By late afternoon he had directed 600 rounds when his communication to the mortars was knocked out. Without hesitation he started checking his wires, although the area was under heavy enemy small arms and artillery fire. When he was within 100 yards of his mortar position, one of his men informed him that the section had been captured and the Germans were using the mortars to fire on the company. Second Lieutenant Gregg with this man and another nearby rifleman started for the gun position where he could see five Germans firing his mortars. He ordered the two men to cover him, crawled up, threw a hand grenade into the position, and then charged it. The hand grenade killed 1, injured 2, Second Lieutenant Gregg took the other two prisoners, and put his mortars back into action.

== See also ==
- List of Medal of Honor recipients for World War II
