= Archimedes Giacomantonio =

American sculptor

Archimedes Aristedes Michael Giacomantonio (January 17, 1906 – October 19, 1988) was an American sculptor. He was also known as Jock Manton, a corruption of his surname. During his career he was commissioned to create works in Hudson County, New Jersey, Washington, D.C., and in other public and private spaces across the United States. He was known for his busts of noted figures and small-scale figures as well as medallions for the Franklin Mint.

== Biography ==
Giacomantonio was born in Downtown Jersey City to Italian immigrant parents. He attended Dickinson High School. He took his initial art training at the Leonardo da Vinci Art School in New York and studied for five years in Italy at the Royal Academy of Art in Rome and apprenticed with Onorio Ruotolo and Vincenzo Gemito.

During World War II, he was sergeant technician in the United States Army Medical Corps. His duties included molding artificial limbs, ears, and other parts of the human body for the Medical Corps.

He moved to Sparta, New Jersey in 1936, where he lived until his death. He is interred in Holy Cross Cemetery in North Arlington, New Jersey.

== Works ==
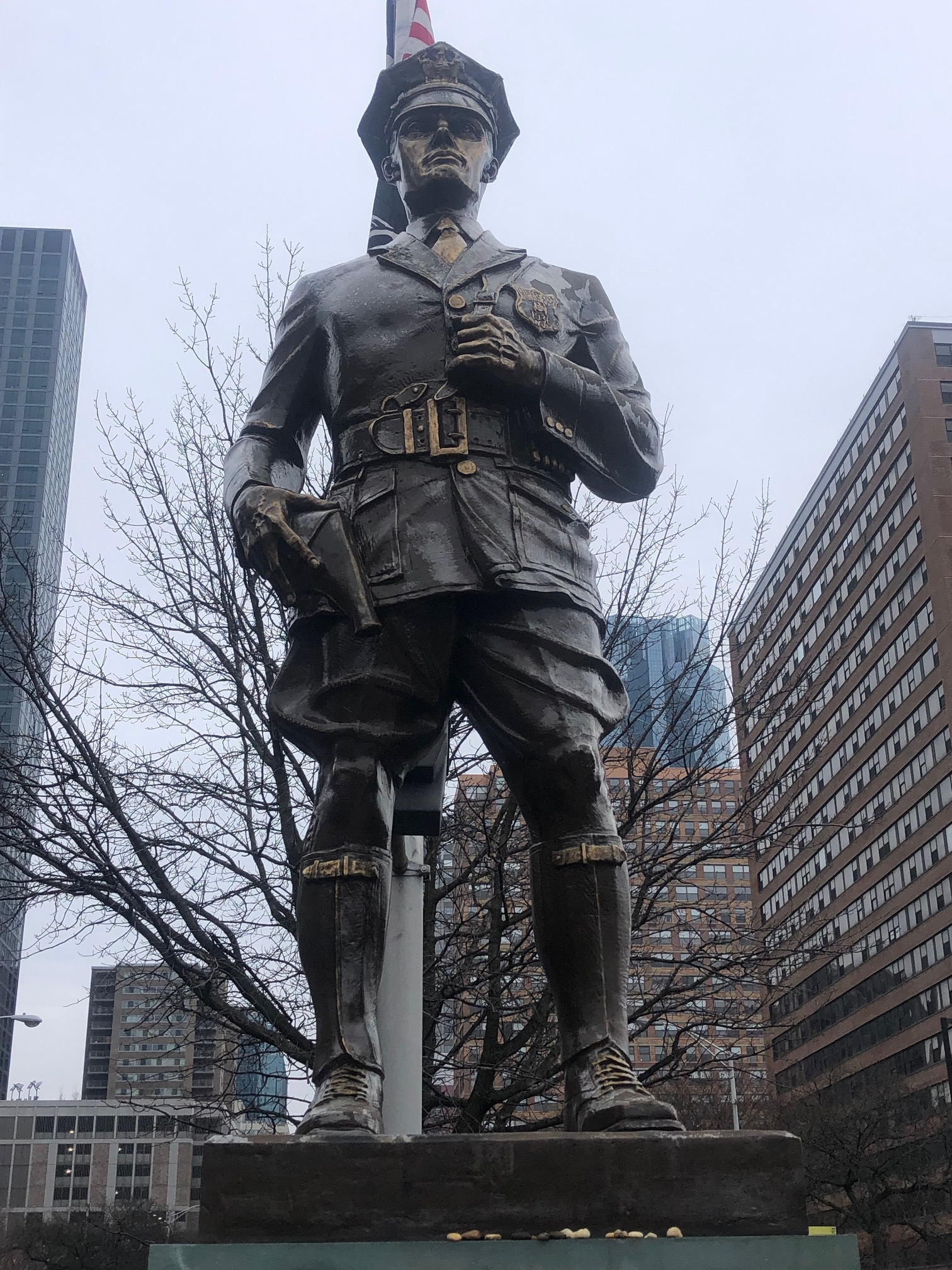
Jersey City Police Memorial

- Lincoln the Rail-splitter (circa 1926), Lincoln High School, Jersey City
  - Statuette depicts pensive Abraham Lincoln as a young man seated on a log. His axe is buried in the wood and, instead of splitting logs, Lincoln is shown reading an open book, which lies on his lap. Created when Giacomantonio when he was 19 years old. The graduating class of Lincoln High School purchased the work for the school, where it is displayed in lobby. It was the basis for a life-size work created for the Sparta, New Jersey public library.
- Bust of Vincenzo Gemito (circa 1926)
- Jersey City Police Memorial (1936), City Hall, Jersey City
- Statue of Christopher Columbus (1936), Hoboken, New Jersey
  - Reproductions at Columbus Park in Memphis, Tennessee and Hazleton, Pennsylvania
- Bust of Dwight D. Eisenhower (1945)
- Bust of Woodrow Wilson, Harry S. Truman Presidential Library and Museum, Independence, Missouri
- Wounded Soldier (1947), Lincoln High School, Jersey City
- Statue of Christopher Columbus (1950), Jersey City
- The American Dream (Bust of Martin Luther King Jr.) (1968), privately held
- Bust of Christopher Columbus (1979), Ellsworth Park, Union City, New Jersey
