= James Novelli =

American sculptor

- Born: October 18, 1885; Sulmona, Italy
- Died: May 31, 1940 (aged 54)
- Notable work: America Triumphant
- Style: sculpture

James Salvatore John Novelli (October 18, 1885 – May 31, 1940) was an Italian American sculptor known for his funeral and war memorials.

== Biography ==
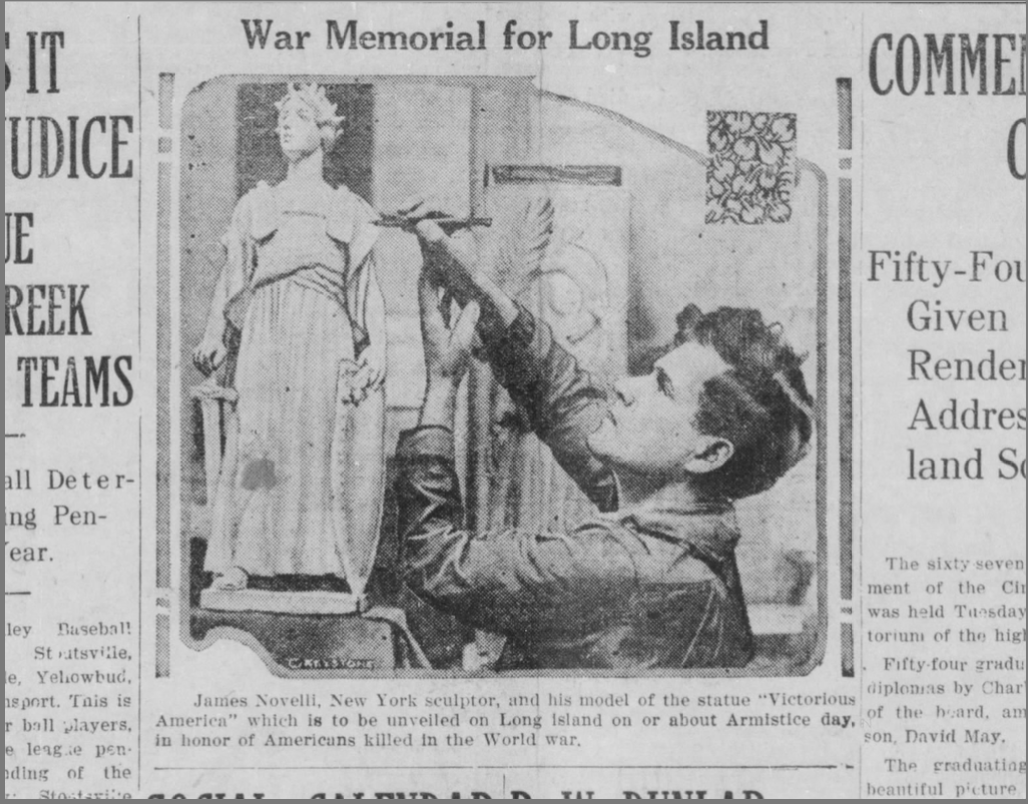
The Circleville Herald, 3 Jun 1925

Novelli was born in 1885 in Sulmona, Italy. His family settled in lower Manhattan in New York, and he was raised in a tenement house on Mulberry Street in the Five Points, which became the heart of Little Italy.

In 1903, Novelli returned to Italy to study and graduated from the Royal Academy of Fine Arts in Rome in 1908. As a student, he earned an honorable mention for his work submitted to the 1906 International Exposition in Paris. He participated in the New York competition about "conceptions of war" in 1915.

He later lived in Chelsea and received numerous commissions. After marrying, he lived in Queens, with his wife, Lillian, and son.

His career foundering during the Depression, he worked with the city's monument crew. Novelli committed suicide in 1940.

== Works ==
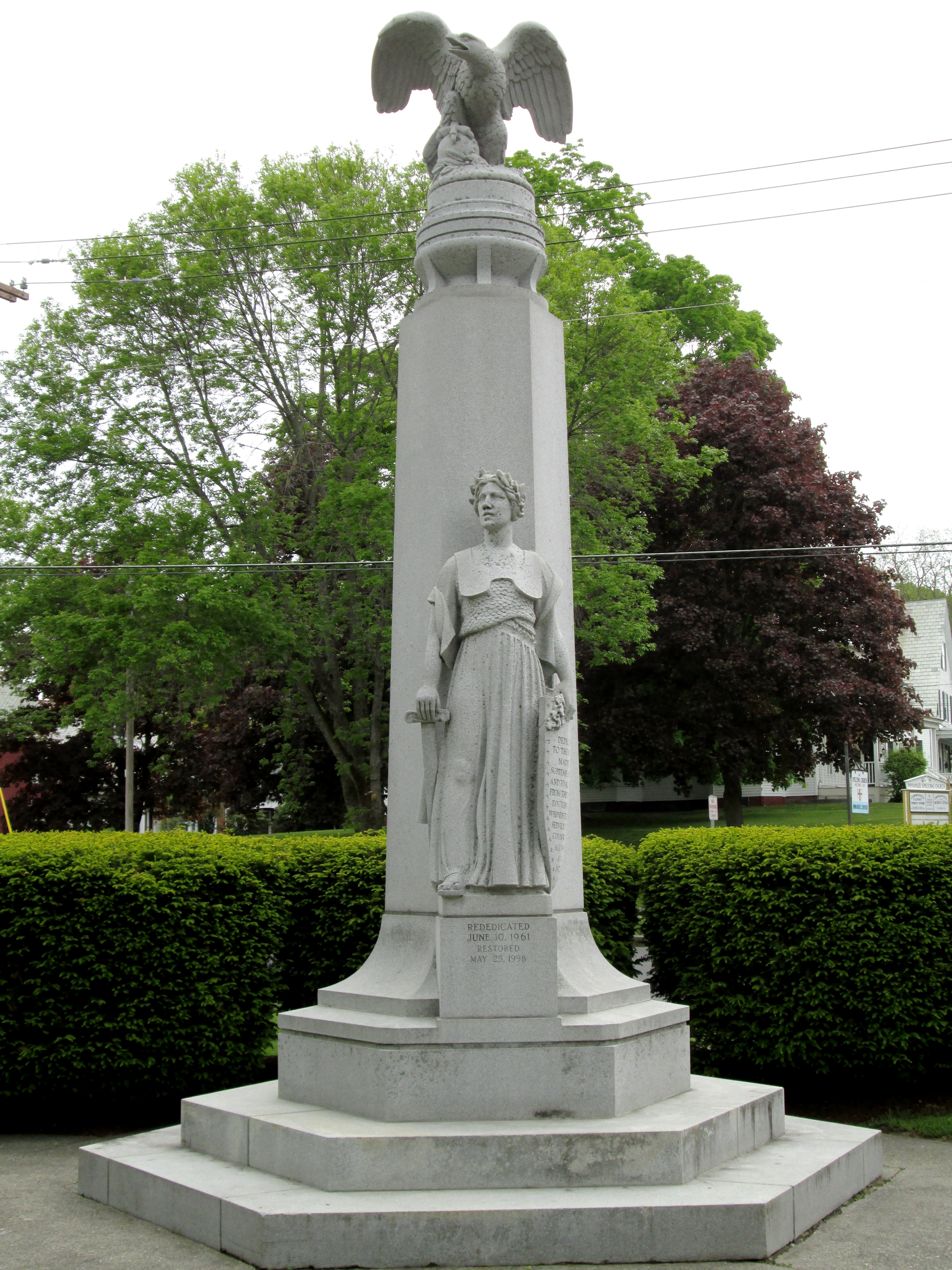
Rockingham War Memorial

- America Triumphant (1922), Pershing Field, Jersey City Heights, Jersey City
- Clayton Point World War I Monument (1928) Clason Point, Bronx
- Memorial door DeSalvio mausoleum (1938), Calvary Cemetery, Queens
- Memorial door LaGioia mausoleum (1923), Calvary Cemetery, Queens
- Memorial door Latorraca mausoleum (1938), Calvary Cemetery, Queens
- Rockingham War Memorial (1927-1928), Bellows Falls, Vermont
- Saratoga Monument (1920) Saratoga Park, Bedford–Stuyvesant, Brooklyn
- The Spirit of Flight (1928), Fort Wayne, Indiana
- Victory Memorial Fountain (1929), William F. Moore Park, Corona, Queens (fountain removed, tablet remains)
- Winfield War Memorial and Victorious America. (1926) Winfield Plaza, Woodside, Queens
- Woodlawn Cemetery (Bronx, New York), memorials
