= Hudson County Park System =

Department in Hudson County, New Jersey, US

The Hudson County Park System owns and operates several county parks in Hudson County, New Jersey. It has its roots in the City Beautiful movement around the turn of the twentieth century. The system comprises eight parks (the extension of one which includes a golf course) comprising 716.52 acres (290.0 ha). Additionally, the county owns acreage in preservation areas in the New Jersey Meadowlands

== History ==
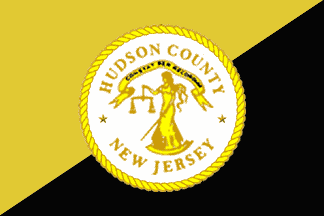
Flag of Hudson County, New Jersey

The City Beautiful movement at the turn of the twentieth century was conceived to revitalize industrialized urban communities and to provide them with public space for recreational activities.

The concept of a county park system began in the 1880s. The Hudson County Park Commission was created in 1892 to plan a park and boulevard system like those provided in other cities such as Boston and Newark. (There had been discussions of building a county long road as early as the 1870s.) The first feature the commission initiated was a boulevard that would connect the future parks called Hudson Boulevard (renamed John F. Kennedy Boulevard in the 1960s). It was constructed from 1892 to 1897, under Chief Engineer Edlow W. Harrison, in some places incorporating existing roads and became the county's principal north-south corridor. From Bayonne it wound north 14 miles to the Bergen County line. It was finished a few years later when it turned east in a loop and went south again as (Hudson) Boulevard East along the top edge of the Bergen Hill cliff to end at King's Bluff in Weehawken. In 1908 the State of New Jersey reconstructed the road to "improve and beautify it".

In 1908, the Commission was sued by Philip Daab (Daab v. Hudson County Park Commission) due to a land dispute.

The architects Daniel W. Langton and Charles N. Lowrie were active in the City Beautiful movement of architecture and were founding members of the American Society of Landscape Architects. Lowrie succeeded Langton as Landscape Architect for the Hudson County Park Commission, a position he held for thirty years.

== James J. Braddock—North Hudson Park ==
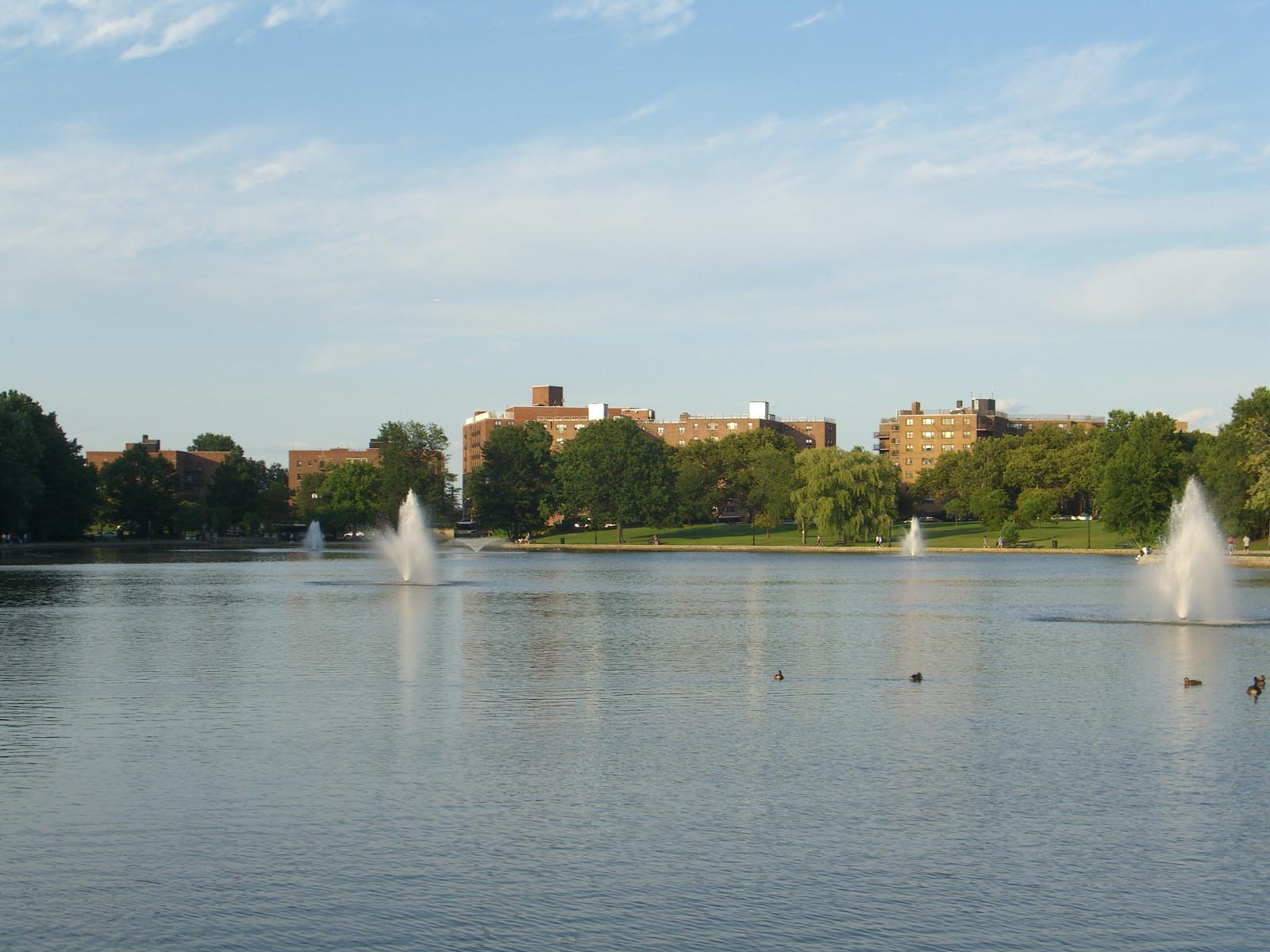
Woodcliff Lake

The park is in North Hudson (40.7995°N 73.9962°W); the collection of municipalities in the northern part of the county; specifically the Woodcliff Section of North Bergen. Its name refers to its location and to honor of James J. Braddock, World Heavy Weight Boxing Champion from 1935 to 1937 and inducted in hall of fame in 2001. who was a lifelong resident of North Bergen. It is also known colloquially as “80th Street Park” or “El Parque de La Ochenta”. It is roughly bounded by 79th Street to the south, Bergenline Avenue on the west, and Boulevard East to the east and north. The park was created in 1910 and encompasses an area of 167 acres (67.6 ha). including Woodcliff Lake, the 16 acres (6.5 ha) body of water that is the largest lake in the county. The North Hudson Park UFO sightings occurred on January 12, 1975. The presence of a North Bergen temporary school building has led to controversy and referendums.

== Columbus Park ==
Columbus Park is near Hoboken High School on west side of Clinton Street between 9th and 10th Streets (40.74809°N 74.032439°W). It is 2.6 acres Originally designed by Charles N. Lowrie, who was landscape architect for the Hudson County Parks Department. There is a statue of Christopher Columbus in the center of the park. There is also a memorial dedicated to John A. Sacci, a beloved high school history teacher, who was tragically shot on February 12, 1998. The monument was facilitated by students and to this day, the word "remembrance" is misspelled on the marble monument.

== Stephen R. Gregg Park—Bayonne Park ==
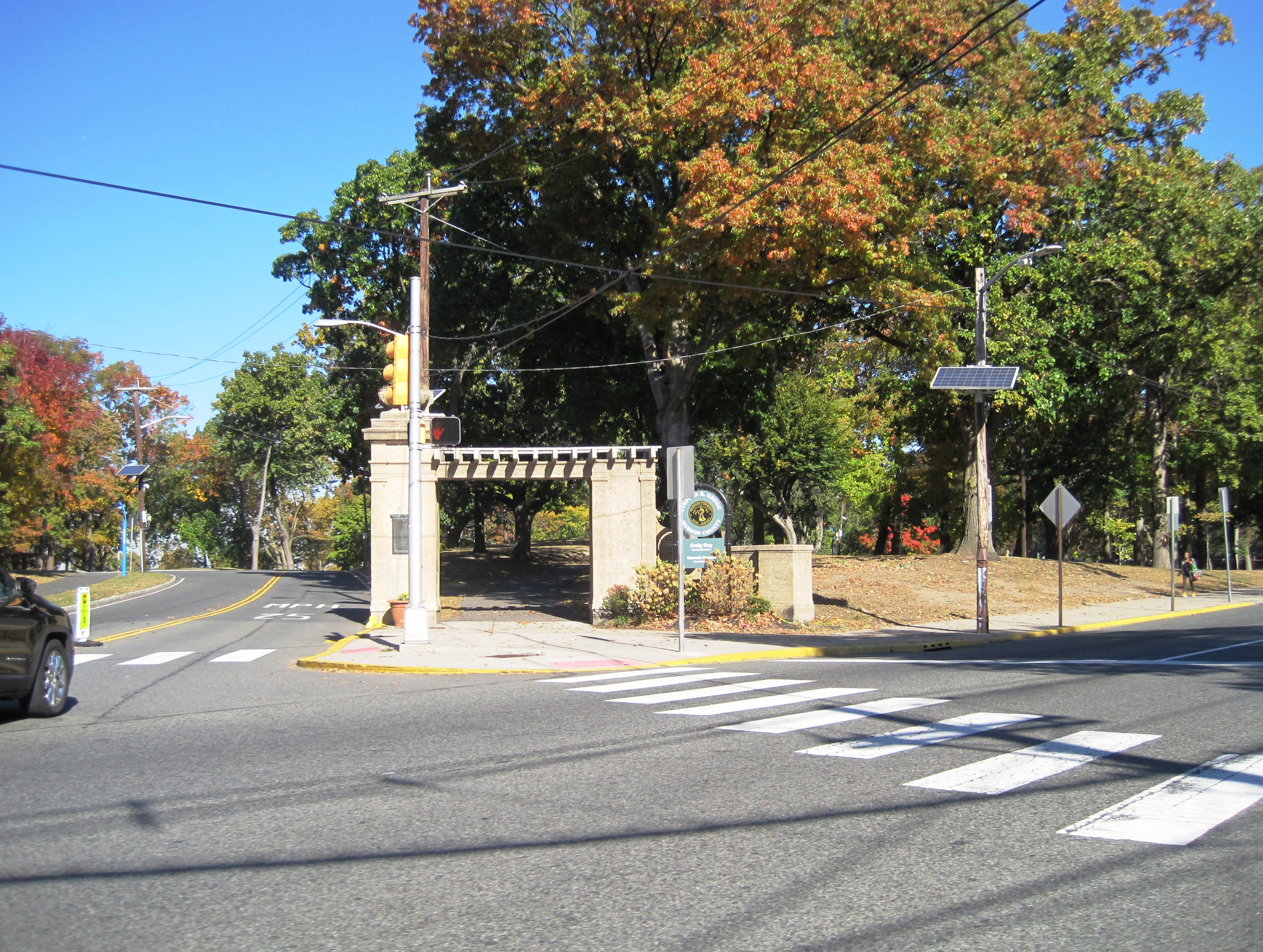
Southern entrance to Stephen G. Gregg Park at Kennedy Boulevard and Park Drive

Stephen R. Gregg Park (40.662411°N 74.110228°W), also known as Bayonne Park, is located west of Kennedy Boulevard on Newark Bay in Bayonne. Comprising 97.5 acres, it was originally designed by Charles N. Lowrie, landscape architect for the Hudson County Parks Department. Named for Stephen Raymond Gregg Sr. (September 1, 1914 – February 4, 2005), a Bayonne native and United States Army soldier who received the United States military's highest decoration—the Medal of Honor—for his actions in World War II. A statue of Gregg in the park was unveiled in 2021 It is a component of the Hackensack RiverWalk. In June 2022 landascaped gardens were dedicated to the memory of Bayonne residents who had died of Covid-19.

== Laurel Hill ==
Laurel Hill (40.759204°N 74.086819°W), better known as Snake Hill, is the newest county park, along the Hackensack River southwest of Secaucus Junction in Secaucus and is part of the New Jersey Meadowlands. Visible from the eastern spur of the New Jersey Turnpike, the rock rises 150 feet (46 m) from the surrounding Meadowlands. It comprises 104.5 acres with potential 100 adjacent acres for expansion.

== Lincoln Park ==
Lincoln Park (40.724640°N 74.080939°W), started in 1905, is in the Bergen Section of Jersey City, New Jersey. The eastern part of the park has an area of 150.4 acres (60.9 ha). Its main entrance is adorned with Lincoln the Mystic.

== Lincoln Park West—Skyway Golf Course ==
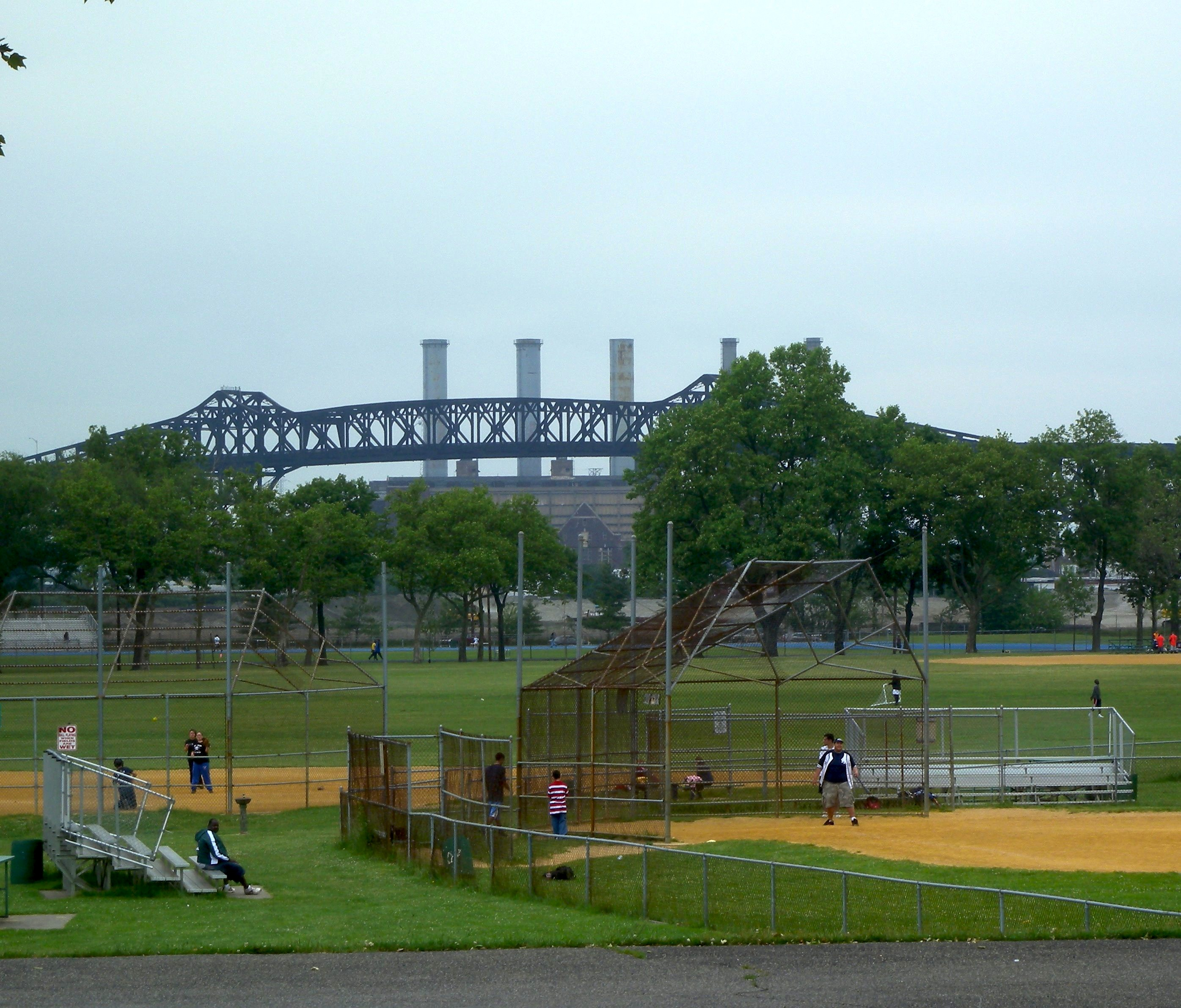
Skyway from Lincoln Park

Lincoln Park West comprises 123 acres. The Skyway Golf Course is the only public golf facility in the county. The nine-hole course is along the Hackensack River west of U.S. Route 1/9 Truck between Communipaw and Duncan Avenues. The 55 acres (22.3 ha) course was created on a larger site and raised the about 1.2 million cubic yards of soil to an average 25 feet with hills as high as 45 feet. It opened in June 2015. Its name is inspired by the Pulaski Skyway. A connection to Skyway Park is planned.

== Mercer Park ==
Mercer Park (40.689028°N 74.095556°W) was created from the remnants of Curries Woods at the border of Greenville, Jersey City and Bayonne north of the National Docks Secondary rail line. It was named after General Hugh Mercer, a famous American Revolution figure. It was developed during the Works Progress Administration (WPA) era under the New Deal. The park lost much of its land to the city's largest housing authority project in 1959, except a small tract in Bayonne of 6.4 acres.

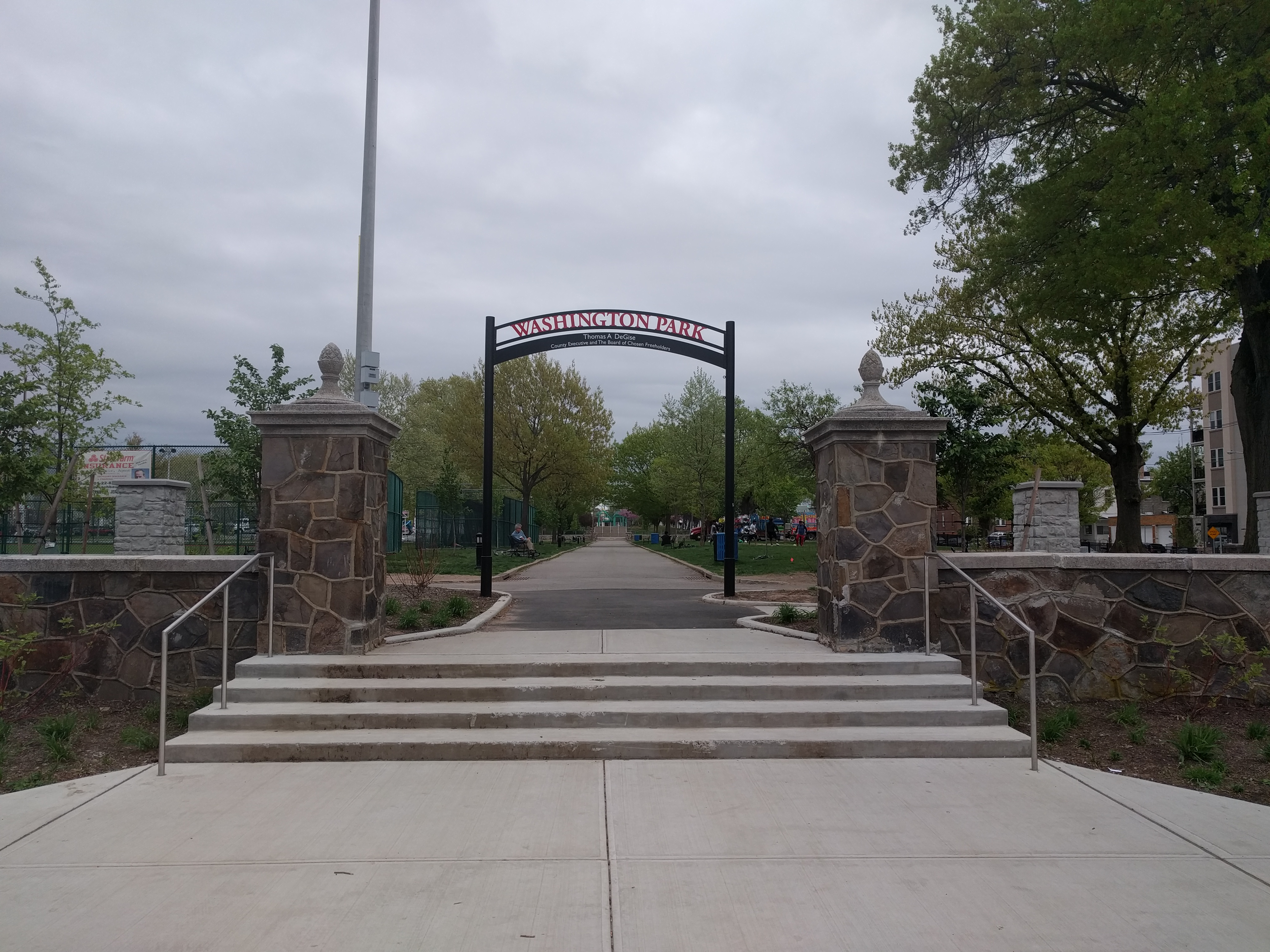
Washington Park

== Washington Park ==
Washington Park (40.752811°N 74.044714°W) straddles Jersey City Heights and Union City along their border on Paterson Plank Road. It comprises 21 acres (8.5 ha) west of Palisade Avenue. Into the 1900s the land was owned by the Stuckleys, a wealthy New York family who operated it as carnival or campground and held fairs, circuses, and Wild West shows. Much of the park was laid-out during the Works Progress Administration in the 1930s.

== West Hudson Park ==
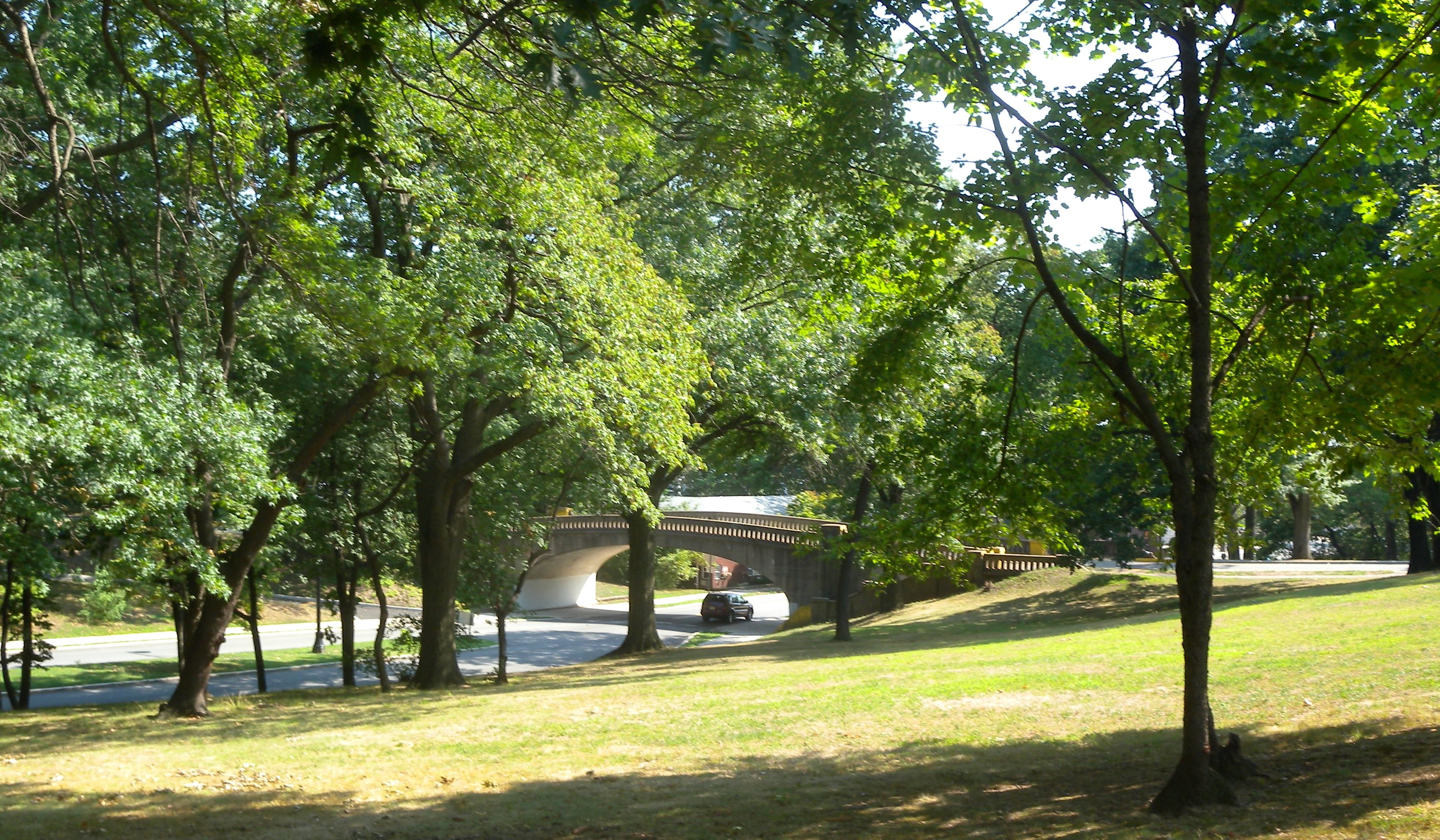
West Hudson Park

West Hudson Park (40.7597°N 74.1454°W) is located in the West Hudson communities of Harrison and Kearny. It was originally designed by Charles N. Lowrie. It comprises 43.4 acres.

== See also ==
- Urban park
- Hackensack RiverWalk
- Hudson River Waterfront Walkway
- List of cemeteries in Hudson County, New Jersey
- Essex County Park System
