= Attilio Salemme =

American artist (1911–1955)

- Born: October 11, 1911; Chestnut Hill, Middlesex County, Massachusetts, U.S.
- Died: January 24, 1955 (aged 43); New York City, U.S.
- Burial place: Holy Cross Cemetery, North Arlington, New Jersey, U.S.
- Occupations: Painter, muralist
- Movement: Surrealism
- Spouse: Lucia Autorino (m. 1943–1955; his death)
- Children: 2
- Relatives: Antonio Salemme (step-brother)

Attilio Salemme (October 11, 1911 – January 24, 1955) was an American painter and muralist. He was known for his Surrealist works.

== Life and career ==
Attilio Salemme was born on October 11, 1911, in Chestnut Hill a village near Boston in Middlesex County, Massachusetts. His older step-brother was a painter and sculptor, Antonio Salemme (1892–1995). Salemme joined the United States Marine Corps at age 16. By age 18 in the 1930s, he moved to New York City.

He didn't have any formal training in art, but his older brother taught him to paint. His first solo exhibition was in 1945, at Sixtyseven Gallery in New York City. He painted rooftop murals for the Manhattan House residential building in 1951.

Salemme painted surreal rectangular figures, reminiscent of works by Wifredo Lam and Paul Klee. He was friends with sculptor Alexander Calder.

Salemme was married to painter Lucia Autorino, and in the 1950s they lived at 20 Commerce Street in Greenwich Village. They had two sons.

== Death and legacy ==
On January 24, 1955, Salemme had a heart attack at age 43 while riding on the bus. He took a taxi to Bellevue Hospital where he died shortly upon arrival. He was survived by his wife and children.

== Museum collections ==
- Amon Carter Museum of American Art, Fort Worth, Texas
- British Museum, London
- Brooklyn Museum, Brooklyn, New York City
- Metropolitan Museum of Art, New York City
- Museum of Modern Art (MoMA), New York City
- National Gallery of Art, Washington, D.C.
- Rhode Island School of Design Museum, Providence, Rhode Island
- Smithsonian American Art Museum, Washington, D.C.
- Whitney Museum of American Art, New York City

== Publications ==
- Whitney Museum of American Art; Attilio, Salemme (1959). Attilio Salemme (exhibition catalogue). Institute of Contemporary Art (Boston).
- Breeskin, Adelyn B.; Haifley, Julie Link (1978). Attilio Salemme: Inhabitant of a Dream (exhibition catalogue). Washington, D.C.: Smithsonian Instititution Press.
- Attilio Salemme: Paintings, Drawings, Watercolors. Grace Borgenicht Gallery. 1978.
- Attilio Salemme (exhibition catalogue). Grace Borgenicht Gallery. 1983.
