= A Handshake for the Century =

Statue in Youngstown, Ohio, U.S.

Coordinates: 41°5′47.8″N 80°38′59.6″W

- Artist: Marc Mellon
- Year: 2021
- Subject: Jackie Robinson; George Shuba
- Dimensions: 7 ft (2.1 m) (height)
- Location: Youngstown, Ohio, U.S.

A Handshake for the Century is a bronze statue located in Youngstown, Ohio. The statue commemorates a handshake between African American baseball player Jackie Robinson of the Montreal Royals and his white teammate George Shuba, a native of Youngstown. Created by sculptor Marc Mellon, it was unveiled in 2021, seventy-five years after it occurred.

The statue depicts a moment from April 18, 1946, the day Robinson became the first African-American baseball player to break into "organized professional baseball" in the 20th century. The game was against the Jersey City Giants at Roosevelt Stadium in Jersey City, New Jersey. After grounding out in his first at-bat, he hit a three-run home run in his second. Shuba, who followed Robinson in the lineup, shook Robinson's hand as he crossed home plate. The image of Robinson's and Shuba's handshake became an iconic moment in baseball history.

Initially meant to be unveiled on the anniversary itself, the unveiling was delayed due to COVID-19 restrictions. It finally took place on July 17, 2021. Amongst the speakers was Shuba's son Mike. The statue was funded with the help of public donations.
