= The Road from Coorain =

The Road from Coorain may refer to:

- The Road from Coorain (book), a 1989 memoir by Jill Ker Conway
- The Road from Coorain (film), a 2002 film adaptation of the memoir
