= List of Italian-American film directors =

Italian Americans have been highly influential on American cinema, notably as directors, but also as actors, producers and screenwriters.

== Notable directors ==
- Alan Alda
- Lucia Aniello
- Greg Antonacci
- Emile Ardolino
- Paul Attanasio
- Edoardo Ballerini
- Joseph Barbera
- Richard Benedict
- Andrew Berardini
- Adam Bernstein
- Matt Bettinelli-Olpin
- Mike Birbiglia
- Lizzy Borden
- Frank Borzage
- Steve Buscemi
- Tom Byron
- Antonio Campos
- Giovanni Capitello
- Frank Capra
- Don Capria
- John Carluccio
- D.J. Caruso
- Damian Chapa
- David Chase
- Matt Cimber
- Michael Cimino
- Chris Columbus
- Marjorie Conrad
- Jackie Cooper
- Christopher Coppola
- Francis Ford Coppola
- Gia Coppola
- Roman Coppola
- Sofia Coppola
- Frank Coraci
- Don Coscarelli
- Adamo Paolo Cultraro
- Philip D'Antoni
- Gerard Damiano
- Frank De Felitta
- Robert De Niro
- Brian De Palma
- Michael DeLuise
- William DeMeo
- James DeMonaco
- Danny DeVito
- Denise Di Novi
- Tom DiCillo
- Anthony DiMaria
- Vincent D'Onofrio
- Illeana Douglas
- Ben Falcone
- Jon Favreau
- Anthony C. Ferrante
- Abel Ferrara
- Soleil Moon Frye
- Vincent Gallo
- Tony Giglio
- Frank D. Gilroy
- Tony Gilroy
- Bob Giraldi
- Caroline Giuliani
- Francesca Gregorini
- James William Guercio
- Anthony Michael Hall
- Alexandra Hedison
- Anjelica Huston
- John Mese
- Ariana Jollee
- Sebastian Junger
- John Krokidas
- Gregory La Cava
- Richard LaGravenese
- Frank LaLoggia
- Walter Lantz
- John Lavachielli
- John Leslie
- Joe Lipari
- Robert Longo
- William Lustig
- Albert Magnoli
- Julie Mallozzi
- Don Mancini
- Garry Marshall
- Penny Marshall
- Scott Marshall
- Gregori J. Martin
- Armand Mastroianni
- Theodore Melfi
- Vincente Minnelli
- Kate and Laura Mulleavy
- Nica Noelle
- Steve Oedekerk
- Joe Oriolo
- Al Pacino
- Tom Palmer
- Chazz Palminteri
- Matt Pizzolo
- Edoardo Ponti
- Derek Estlin Purvis
- Kym Ragusa
- Yvonne Rainer
- Chris Reccardi
- Godfrey Reggio
- Rob Renzetti
- James Rolfe
- Bonnie Rotten
- Tao Ruspoli
- David O. Russell
- Russo brothers
- Bettina Santo Domingo
- Tom Savini
- Nancy Savoca
- Lorene Scafaria
- John Scagliotti
- Martin Scorsese
- Gary Sinise
- Steven Soderbergh
- Vincent Spano
- John Stagliano
- Sylvester Stallone
- Michael Stefano
- Connie Stevens
- Tony Stevens
- Crafty St. James
- Quentin Tarantino
- Chris Terrio
- Joey Travolta
- Adriana Trigiani
- Stanley Tucci
- John Turturro
- Nick Vallelonga
- Robert G. Vignola
- Antonio Zarro
- Robert Zemeckis

== See also ==
- List of Italian Americans
- List of Italian-American actors
- List of Italian American entertainers
- List of Italian-American television characters
