= Elizabeth Topham Kennan =

American academic (1938–2025)

15th President of Mount Holyoke College
- In office 1978–1995
- Preceded by: David Truman
- Succeeded by: Joanne V. Creighton

Personal details
- Born: February 25, 1938 Philadelphia, Pennsylvania, U.S.
- Died: July 18, 2025 (aged 87) Danville, Kentucky, U.S.
- Party: Democratic
- Spouse: Michael Burns (m. 1986)
- Children: Frank Alexander Kennan
- Education: Mount Holyoke College; Oxford University; University of Washington
- Profession: professor of history and college president

Elizabeth Topham Kennan (February 25, 1938 – July 18, 2025) was an American academic administrator who served as the 15th president of Mount Holyoke College from 1978 to 1995. She also served as president of the Five Colleges consortium from 1985 to 1994. She had earlier taught medieval history at Catholic University in Washington, DC.

== Early life and education ==
Kennan was born in Philadelphia, Pennsylvania. She received her Bachelor of Arts summa cum laude in history from Mount Holyoke in 1960. Winning a Marshall Scholarship, she studied for a second bachelor's degree (subsequently Master of Arts) at St. Hilda's College, Oxford University, which she completed in 1962. She earned her Doctor of Philosophy from the University of Washington in 1966.

== Career ==
Kennan was professor of medieval history at Catholic University from 1966 to 1978 before joining Mount Holyoke as president from 1978 to 1995. As president of Mount Holyoke, she was a proponent of single-sex education, stating to the Los Angeles Times in 1994: "Single-sex education for girls is a proven method for ensuring that they reach their fullest potential. I will be the first to call for coeducation at Mount Holyoke, the country's oldest women's college, when our society grants young women equal status in coeducational settings". Kennan was also president of the Five Colleges consortium for nine years (1985–1994) while at Mount Holyoke. Upon her retirement from Mount Holyoke in 1995, the Kennan Faculty Chair and Lectureship was established.

She also served as a trustee of the University of Notre Dame, along with the National Trust for Historic Preservation and the National Trust Community Investment Corporation, and on the oversight committee of the Folger Shakespeare Library. Among the corporate boards on which Kennan served as director or trustee were Bell Atlantic, Shawmut Bank, and Putnam Investments.

== Mystery author ==
In 2000, Kennan co-authored the mystery novel, Overnight Float, with Jill Ker Conway (former president of Smith College). The novel is published under the pen name "Clare Munnings" and was their first venture into the mystery genre.

== Personal life and death ==
Kennan was married from 1986 until her death to Michael Burns, whom she met as a professor of European history at Mount Holyoke. A former actor (Wagon Train and It's a Man's World) before his academic career, he is now professor emeritus. While at Mount Holyoke, the couple resided in Ipswich in Essex County, Massachusetts, and in the village of South Woodstock in Windsor County in eastern Vermont. As of 2002, they resided in Boyle County near Danville, Kentucky, where they restored the Cambus-Kenneth Estate, a Thoroughbred horse, cattle, and crop farm listed on the National Register of Historic Places.

A Democrat like her husband, Kennan in 2006 contributed to the liberal interest group EMILY's List and to the successful election campaign of Democrat John Yarmuth of Louisville for Kentucky's 3rd congressional district seat.

Kennan died on July 18, 2025, at the age of 87.

== See also ==
- List of historians
