= Santee (film) =

1973 film by Gary Nelson

- Theatrical poster
- Directed by: Gary Nelson
- Written by: Brand Bell
- Produced by: Deno Paoli; Edward Platt; Caruth C. Byrd
- Starring: Glenn Ford; Dana Wynter; Jay Silverheels; Michael Burns; Harry Townes
- Cinematography: Donald M. Morgan
- Edited by: George W. Brooks
- Music by: Don Randi
- Production companies: American Video Cinema; Vagabond Productions; Eaves Movie Ranch
- Distributed by: Crown International Pictures
- Release date: September 1973
- Running time: 93 minutes
- Country: United States
- Language: English

Santee is a 1973 American Western film directed by Gary Nelson and starring Glenn Ford. It was one of the first motion pictures to be shot electronically on videotape, using Norelco PCP-70 portable plumbicon NTSC cameras and portable Ampex VR-1200 2" VTRs, before being transferred to film at Consolidated Film Industries in Hollywood. It was the only film to be produced by Edward Platt (of Get Smart fame).

== Plot ==
Jody Deakes joins up with his father after many years, just to discover that the man is part of an outlaw gang on the run from a relentless bounty hunter named Santee. Soon after Santee catches up to the gang, Jody's father is killed.

Jody follows Santee in hopes of taking vengeance for his father's death. Instead, however, Jody discovers that Santee is a good and loving man, tormented by the death of his young son at the hands of another outlaw gang. Santee and his wife take Jody in, and a father and son relationship begins to grow. Then the gang that shot Santee's son shows up.

The Banner gang arrives and kills the sheriff and robs the bank, killing several other citizens. Jody wants to pursue the gang but Santee disagrees. He has decided to not leave the Three Arrows unless it is on ranch business. Jody goes after the gang alone. Santee leaves to catch up to Jody. They meet and head for the Mecca near the border where Santee believes the gang is located.

At the Mecca, Santee sees three of the gang members in the bar. Jody climbs to the second floor, enters a room and kills one gang member as he reached for his gun. Santee gets most of the gang members. Banner shoots at the same time as Sam and Jody. A wagon is seen being returned to the ranch, carrying a coffin. As it arrives at the house, it’s being driven by Sam and Jody has been killed.

== Cast ==
- Glenn Ford as Santee
- Michael Burns as Jody
- Dana Wynter as Valerie
- Jay Silverheels as John Crow [final film performance]
- Harry Townes as Sheriff Carter
- John Larch as Banner
- Robert Wilke as Deaks
- Robert Donner as J.C.
- Taylor Lacher as Lance
- John Bailey as Homesteader
- X Brands as Hook
- Caruth C. Byrd as Piano Player
- Chuck Courtney as Grayson
- Lindsay Crosby as Horn
- William Ford as Postmaster
- John Hart as Cobbles
- Russ McCubbin as Rafe
- Robert Mellard as Jonesy
- Brad Merhage as Santee's Son
- Boyd Morgan as Stagecoach Driver
- Ben Zeller as Freddie

== See also ==
- List of American films of 1973
