= Clare Munnings =

American novelist

Clare Munnings is the pen name for two American mystery authors, Jill Ker Conway (former president of Smith College) and Elizabeth Topham Kennan (alumna and former president of Mount Holyoke College). Their first novel, Overnight Float, was published in 2000.

== Books ==
- Munnings, Clare; Conway, Jill; Kennan, Elizabeth (2001). Overnight float. New York: Penguin Books. ISBN 9780142000113.

== See also ==
- List of crime writers
