= Michael Burns (actor) =

American actor and historian

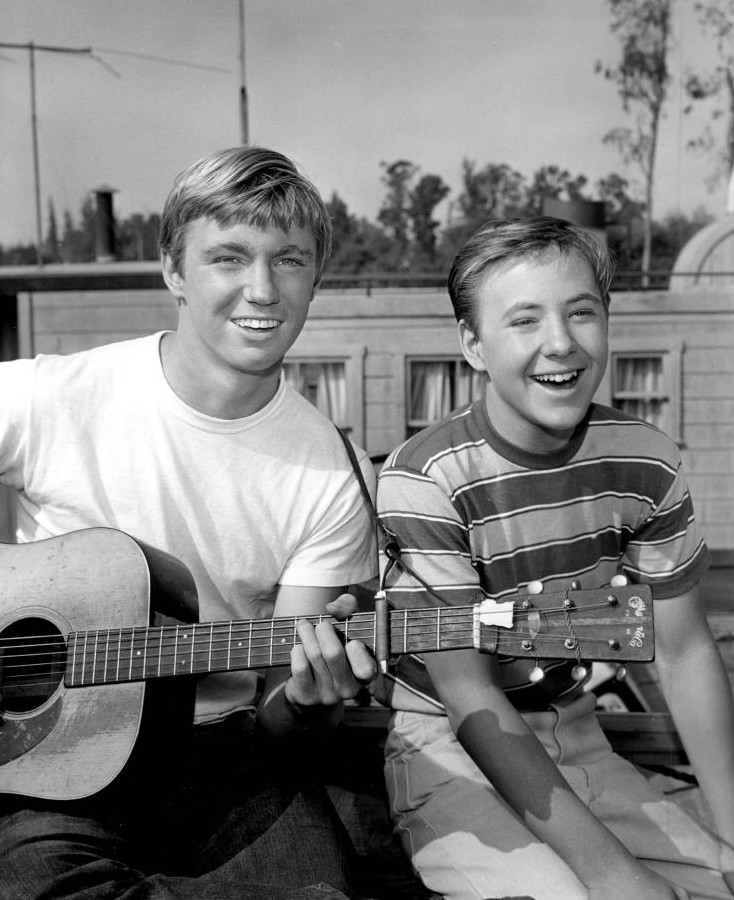
- Burns (right) and Randy Boone from the television show It's A Man's World (1962)
- Born: Michael Thornton Burns; December 30, 1947 (age 78); Mineola, New York, U.S.
- Education: College of William and Mary; University of California, Los Angeles; Yale University
- Occupations: Author; actor; history professor
- Political party: Democrat
- Spouse: Elizabeth Topham Kennan (m. 1986; died 2025)
- Children: 1

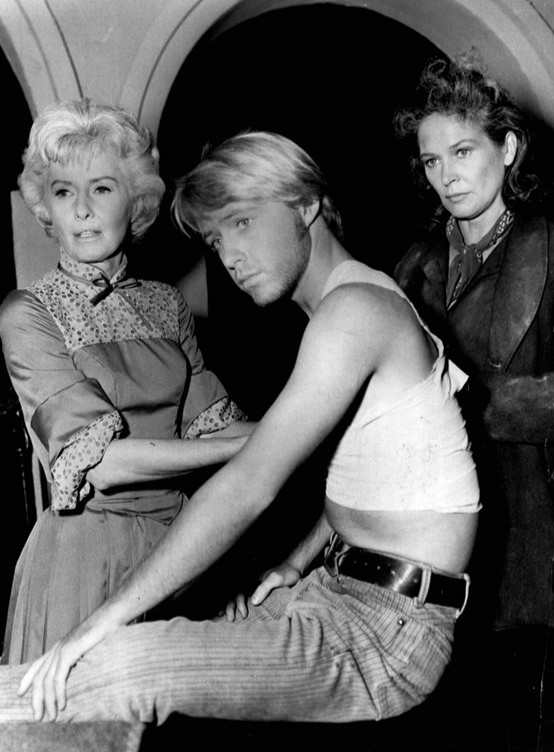
Barbara Stanwyck, Michael Burns, and Colleen Dewhurst in The Big Valley episode "A Day of Terror" (1966)

Michael Thornton Burns (born December 30, 1947) is an American professor emeritus of history at Mount Holyoke College, and a published author and former television and film teen actor, most known for the television series Wagon Train.

== Background ==
Michael Thornton Burns was born in Mineola, New York, on Long Island, to director and producer Frank Xavier Burns (best known for the early television series, Martin Kane, Private Eye) and Mary Lou DeWeese. He has an older sister, Pamela.

In 1949, the family moved to Yonkers. In 1956, the family relocated to Beverly Hills, California, where he attended Beverly Hills High School.

He attended the College of William and Mary in Williamsburg, Virginia for a year before he transferred to the University of California, Los Angeles. There he took classes mostly in the evening, as he often worked as an actor during many days. He resided in Redondo Beach.

He graduated Phi Beta Kappa, summa cum laude in 1976 with a Bachelor of Arts degree in history. He obtained his Master of Arts in European history at the same institution. In 1977, he entered Yale University in New Haven, Connecticut, and earned a PhD in modern European history.

== Career ==
=== Actor ===
Burns was discovered by Lee Wallace, the head of casting for 20th Century Fox, who arranged Burns's appearance on the 1960 episode "A Taste of Lobster" of The Many Loves of Dobie Gillis; Burns played a shrewd 13-year-old businessman, Chrissie Tyler, who owned a babysitting agency. His first credited appearance occurred on Alfred Hitchcock Presents in the 1959 episode "Special Delivery" (Season 5 Episode 10) as Joe. He also guest-starred that first year (1960) in Wagon Train as the son of title character played by Leslie Nielsen in the episode "The Jeremy Dow Story".

He co-starred in a 19-episode NBC comedy-drama It's a Man's World (1962–63 season) as 14-year-old Howie Macauley. Beginning in the fall of 1960, Burns made five guest appearances on Wagon Train during its fourth and fifth seasons. His sixth guest appearance on the final sixth-season episode in 1963 introduced his character, Barnaby West, a regular until the series' end in 1965.

Burns appeared with James Stewart in Mr. Hobbs Takes a Vacation, a 1962 film. In 1965, Burns auditioned for The Monkees and was one of the 14 finalists who completed screen tests (the part eventually going to Davy Jones). In 1966, he joined Audie Murphy in the Western film, 40 Guns to Apache Pass. He appeared as a guest star in over 35 series during the 1960s and 1970s, mostly Westerns, including Gunsmoke, The Virginian, The Road West, The Legend of Jesse James, and The Big Valley. In his 20s, he appeared in several films, including Journey to Shiloh (1968), The Private Navy of Sgt. O'Farrell (1968), That Cold Day in the Park (1969), Thumb Tripping (1972), and Santee (1973). He appeared as Blue Boy in "The LSD Story", the pilot episode of the relaunched Jack Webb police series Dragnet 1967.

=== Historian ===
In 1980, Burns became a professor of history at Mount Holyoke. In 1991, he authored Dreyfus: A Family Affair, 1789–1945, a study of the Dreyfus affair in France during the 1890s. A reviewer of Burns's book writing in The New York Times called the work "a solidly written book about the man and his family, a book that emphasizes the elemental human drama of the captain's story." Upon his retirement in 2002, Burns was honoured by Mount Holyoke with the designation professor emeritus.

== Later life ==
While on the faculty at Mount Holyoke College, Burns wed the college's then-president, Elizabeth Topham Kennan in June 1986. She has a son, Frank Alexander Kennan, from her previous marriage.

Since 2002, the couple resided in Danville, Boyle County, Kentucky. They restored the Cambus-Kenneth Estate, a crop, cattle, and thoroughbred horse farm listed on the National Register of Historic Places.

Burns is a member of the Thoroughbred Club of America, Thoroughbred Owners and Breeders, and the Kentucky Cattlemen's Association.

A Democrat, Burns was a donor to U.S. Senator John Kerry in the 2004 presidential election and to Daniel Mongiardo, the party nominee for the U.S. Senate from Kentucky that same year. Kerry and Mongiardo lost to incumbent Republicans George W. Bush and Jim Bunning, respectively.

== Scholarship ==
=== Books ===
- France and the Dreyfus Affair: A Documentary History (1998)
- Dreyfus: A Family Affair, 1789–1945 (1991)
- Rural Society and French Politics: Boulangism and the Dreyfus Affair, 1886–1900 (1984)

=== Reviews ===
- Michael Burns, review of Gillian Tindall's The Journey of Martin Nadaud: "Local Hero: How a provincial laborer became a reformer in 19th-century France", The New York Times, October 8, 2000.

== Select filmography and television ==
- Police Woman – Powers (1977)
- The Bionic Woman – Carl Franklin (1977)
- The Streets of San Francisco (1973–1976)
- Love, American Style (1972–1973)
- Santee – Jody (1973) With Glenn Ford
- Thumb Tripping – Gary (1972)
- Gidget Gets Married – Jeff (Moondoggie) (1972)
- The F.B.I. – Holt Campbell (Season 6, Ep 22, 1971)
- The Partridge Family – Paul (1971) "The Undergraduate"
- Hawaii Five-O – William T. Shem Jr. (Episode 78, 1971)
- Then Came Bronson Billy Mulavey (Episode 16, 1970)
- The Virginian (6 episodes 1966–1971)
- Gunsmoke – Arlie Joe (1968–1970)
- That Cold Day in the Park – The boy (1969)
- Dragnet 1969 – Joy Riders as Harold Rustin (1969)
- The Mad Room – George Hardy (1969)
- The Outcasts – as Randy Forrest in the episode "The Bounty Children" (1968)
- The Private Navy of Sgt. O'Farrell – Private Johnny Bannon (1968)
- Journey to Shiloh – as Eubie Bell (1968)
- The Big Valley – Danny Wiggins (1968)
- Daniel Boone – Cal Trevor in the episode "The Spanish Horse" (1967)
- Dragnet 1967 – Benjie "Blueboy" Carver in "The LSD Story" with Robert Knapp (1967)
- Dundee and the Culhane – Nugget Hughes in "The 1000 Feet Deep Brief" (1967)
- 40 Guns to Apache Pass (1967)
- Bonanza – Donny Benson in the episode "Napoleon's Children" (1967)
- Insight – six episodes from 1967 to 1972, the last as Douglas Hendricks in '"Nobody Loves a Rich Uncle"
- The Big Valley – Lon Morton (1966)
- Bonanza – Jamie in the episode "The Trouble with Jamie" (1966)
- McHale's Navy - Orvie in the episode "Make Room for Orvie" (1965)
- Wagon Train – Barnaby West (28 episodes, 1960–1965)
- Kraft Mystery Theater – Little Bob Longstreet in the episode "Shadow of a Man" (1963)
- It's A Man's World – Howie Macauley (1962–1963)
- Mr. Hobbs Takes a Vacation – Danny Hobbs (1962)
- Wagon Train – Billy Latham in "The Dr. Denker Story" Season5, Episode 16, Jan 31, 1962
- The Twilight Zone – Paul Stockton in "The Shelter" (1961)
- The Tall Man – Danny in "Ransom of a Town" (1961)
- Wagon Train – Homer Banning in "The Odyssey of Flint McCullough" (02/15/1961)
- Alfred Hitchcock Presents (1961) (Season 6 Episode 29: "The Pearl Necklace") - Billy Lansing
- Tales of Wells Fargo – Billy Matson in "Frightened Witness" (1960)
- Shotgun Slade – in "The Missing Dog" (1960)
- Wrangler – Clary Browning in the episode "The Affair with Browning's Woman" (1960)
- The Many Loves of Dobie Gillis – Chrissie Tyler in the episode "A Taste For Lobster" (1960)
- Wagon Train – Bruce Millikan in the episode "The Jeremy Dow Story" (1960 – S4E14)
- Alfred Hitchcock Presents (1960) (Season 6 Episode 2: "The Doubtful Doctor") - Sidney
- Wagon Train- Billy Justis in the episode "The Allison Justis Story" (1960-S4E4)
- Alfred Hitchcock Presents (1959) (Season 5 Episode 10: "Special Delivery") - Joe
