= Michael Conrad =

American actor (1925–1983)

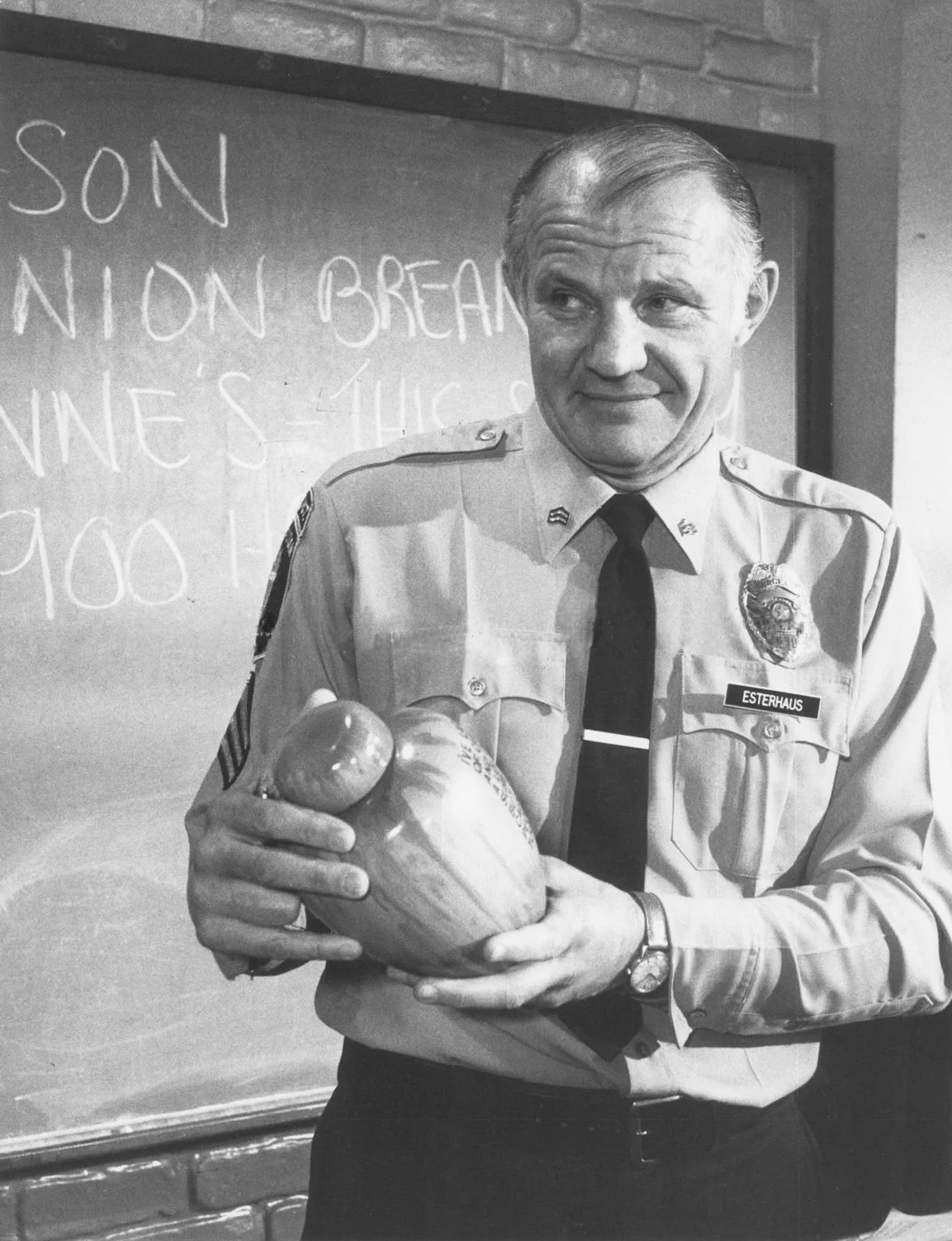
- Conrad in Hill Street Blues, 1981
- Born: October 16, 1925; New York City, U.S.
- Died: November 22, 1983 (aged 58); Los Angeles, California, U.S.
- Occupation: Actor
- Years active: 1937–1983
- Spouses: Denise McCluggage (m. 1953; div. 1954); Emilie Demille (m. 1963; div. 1967); Sima Goldberg (m. 1974)

Michael Conrad (October 16, 1925 – November 22, 1983) was an American actor, perhaps best known for his portrayal of veteran cop Sgt. Phil Esterhaus on Hill Street Blues—a role for which he won two Emmy Awards for Outstanding Supporting Actor in a Drama Series in 1981 and 1982. Among his other credits were the short-lived television series Delvecchio (1976–1977); and the films The War Lord (1965), They Shoot Horses, Don't They? (1969), The Todd Killings (1971), and The Longest Yard (1974).

== Life and career ==
Conrad served in the United States Army during World War II. He had a long acting career in television from the 1950s to the 1980s. In 1962 he appeared in the television series Car 54, Where Are You? in an uncredited part as a construction worker. He played Felton Grimes, the title character and murder victim, in the 1963 Perry Mason episode "The Case of the Bigamous Spouse", and in 1965 played the role of a villain named AC in My Favorite Martian, "Martin's Revoltin' Development", and played the role of Paul in The F.B.I. (season 1, episode 24), "The Man Who Went Mad by Mistake". He also had a notable supporting part in the 1969 film They Shoot Horses, Don't They?, about a depression-era dance marathon.

In 1972, Conrad played Michael Stivic's conventional Polish-American Uncle Casimir on two episodes of All in the Family. The same year, he appeared, together with Richard Crenna and Alain Delon, in the French-language film Un flic, directed by Jean-Pierre Melville. He also had a memorable role in the 1974 film The Longest Yard, playing Nate Scarboro, a retired NFL tight end (New York Giants) who was also the head coach for "the Mean Machine", the team of prisoners put together by Burt Reynolds's character Paul Crewe to play the team of guards. During the 1976–77 season of Delvecchio, Conrad was a regular as Lt. Macavan.

Other notable films in which Conrad appeared throughout his career include Requiem for a Heavyweight (1962), The War Lord (1965), Blackbeard's Ghost (1968), Castle Keep (1969), Monte Walsh (1970), The Todd Killings (1971), Thumb Tripping (1972), Scream Blacula Scream (1973), and Harry and Walter Go to New York (1976).

Conrad is perhaps best known for his role as Sgt. Philip Freemason Esterhaus on the 1981–1987 police drama Hill Street Blues, a role he played for 71 episodes until his death. Michael Conrad's signature salute at the end of every daily roll call, and at the beginning of every Hill Street Blues episode was "Let's be careful out there."

== Death ==
Conrad died from urethral cancer in November 1983, during the fourth season of Hill Street Blues. The show's writers wrote his death into the show, with the cast offering an affectionate tribute to their colleague and friend.

== Spouses ==
- Denise McCluggage (1953–1954; divorced)
- Emilie Demille (October 30, 1963 – February 1967; divorced)
- Sima Goldberg (January 27, 1974 – November 22, 1983; his death)

== Television and filmography ==
- Demetrius and the Gladiators (1954) as Gladiator (uncredited)
- Harbormaster (1957, TV Series)
- The Mugger (1958) as Guy Throwing Craps
- Requiem for a Heavyweight (1962) as Ma Greeny's Thug
- Naked City (TV series) (1959, TV Series) as Hartog (episode "Fire Island")
- The Edge of Night (1959–1960, TV Series) as "Big" Frank Dubeck
- Car 54, Where Are You? (1962, TV Series) as Construction Foreman / Smasher (uncredited)
- Route 66 (1960–1963, TV Series) as Deputy Sam Harris / Al Jenkins
- Perry Mason (1963, TV Series) as Felton Grimes
- Wagon Train (1963, TV Series) as Luke Moss
- The Twilight Zone (TV Series, episode "Black Leather Jackets") as Deputy Sheriff Harper
- Brenner (1959–1964, TV Series) as Chick Arnel
- Flipper (1964, TV Series) as Conlon
- Rawhide (1965, TV Series) as Jerry Munson
- Daniel Boone (1965, TV Series) as Sharben
- The War Lord (1965) as Rainault
- The Dick Van Dyke Show (1965, TV Series) as Bernie Stern / Mr. Mack
- Gomer Pyle, U.S.M.C. (1966, TV Series) as Sergeant Arthur Henchley
- My Favorite Martian (1966, TV Series) as A.C.
- Laredo (1966, TV Series) as Willie G. Tinney
- Bonanza (1966, TV Series) as Hank Kelly
- I Spy (1965–1966, TV Series) as Dinat / Morton
- Gunsmoke (1964–1966, TV Series) as Cash McLean / Paul Douglas / Dick Corwin
- That Girl (1966, TV Series) as Mr. Johnson
- The Fugitive (1966, TV Series) as Hogan
- Felony Squad (1966–1967, TV Series) as Zackary / Steve
- Blackbeard's Ghost (1968) as Pinetop Purvis
- Lost in Space (1968, TV Series) as Creech
- Sol Madrid (1968) as Scarpi
- Three Guns for Texas (1968) as Ranger Willy G. Tinney
- It Takes a Thief (1968, TV Series) as Anton
- Castle Keep (1969) as Sgt. DeVaca
- They Shoot Horses, Don't They? (1969) as Rollo
- The Virginian (1969–1970, TV Series) as John White / Sam Marish
- Monte Walsh (1970) as Dally Johnson
- The Silent Force (episode "Cry in Concrete") (1970, TV Series) as Max Fredericks
- Head On (1971) as Mike (post-war psychological drama film, directed by Edward J. Lakso)
- The Todd Killings (1971) as Detective Shaw
- Ironside (1970–1971, TV Series) as Tracy / Frank O'Neill
- Thumb Tripping (1972) as Diesel
- Mission: Impossible (1970, TV Series) as Ralph Davies
- Alias Smith and Jones (1972, TV Series) as Mike McCloskey
- Un Flic (1972) as Louis Costa
- All in the Family (1972, TV Series) as Uncle Casimir Stivic
- Scream Blacula Scream (1973) as Sheriff Harley Dunlop
- Love, American Style (1973, TV Series) as Rossi (segment "Love and the See-Through Mind")
- Mannix (1970–1973, TV Series) as Dave Tremble / Rick
- The F.B.I. (1966–1973, TV Series) as Roger Tetlow / Paul Hogan
- The Bob Newhart Show (1973–1974, TV Series) as Mr. Trevesco
- W (1974) as Lt. Whitfield
- The Longest Yard (1974) as Nate Scarboro
- Lucas Tanner (1974, TV Series) as Mr. Farnsworth
- Planet of the Apes (1974, TV Series) as Janor
- Satan's Triangle (1975, TV Movie) as Lt. Cmdr. Pagnolini
- Emergency! (1973–1975, TV Series) - Bob Stecker / Bob Hurley
- S.W.A.T. (1975, TV Series) as Vince
- Gone with the West (1975) as Smithy
- The Rockford Files (1975, TV Series) as George Macklan
- Baby Blue Marine (1976) as Drill Instructor
- Harry and Walter Go to New York (1976) as Billy Gallagher
- Starsky and Hutch (1975–1976, TV Series) as Capt. Mike Ferguson / Cannell
- The Six Million Dollar Man (1975–1977, TV Series) as Boris Retsky / Jimbo
- Little House on the Prairie (1977, TV Series) as Broder
- Hawaii Five-O (1972–1978, TV Series) as Arthur / Kira Johnson
- How the West Was Won (1978, TV Series) as Marshal Russell
- Charlie's Angels (1978, TV Series) as Ed Slocum
- The Waltons (1978, TV Series) as Matt Sarver
- Soap (1978, TV Series) as 'Boomer' David
- Vega$ (1979, TV Series) as Albert Brown
- Barney Miller (1979, TV Series) as Col. Charles Dundee
- CHiPs (1979, TV Series) as Mr. Chambers / Karl Maddox
- Las mujeres de Jeremías (1980) as Spencer
- Cattle Annie and Little Britches (1981) as Engineer
- The Incredible Hulk (1981, TV Series) as Emerson Fletcher
- Hill Street Blues (1981–1984, TV Series) (65 episodes) as Sgt. Phil Esterhaus (final appearance)
