= Thumb Tripping =

1972 film

- Theatrical release poster
- Directed by: Quentin Masters
- Screenplay by: Don Mitchell
- Produced by: Robert Chartoff; Irwin Winkler
- Starring: Michael Burns; Meg Foster; Marianna Hill; Burke Byrnes; Michael Conrad; Bruce Dern
- Cinematography: Harry Stradling, Jr.
- Edited by: Gerald Shepard
- Music by: Bob Thompson
- Distributed by: AVCO Embassy Pictures
- Release date: October 1972
- Running time: 94 minutes
- Country: United States
- Language: English

Thumb Tripping is an American 1972 drama film directed by Quentin Masters, written by Don Mitchell, and starring Michael Burns, Meg Foster, Marianna Hill, Burke Byrnes, Michael Conrad and Bruce Dern. It was released in October 1972, by AVCO Embassy Pictures.

== Plot ==
Adventurous hitchhikers decide to accept every ride they are offered and end up with more than they bargained for.

== Cast ==
- Michael Burns as Gary
- Meg Foster as Shay
- Marianna Hill as Lynn
- Burke Byrnes as Jack
- Michael Conrad as "Diesel"
- Bruce Dern as "Smitty"
- Larry Hankin as "Simp"
- Joyce Van Patten as Mother
- Ed Greenburg as Ed
- Eric Butler as Eric

== See also ==
- List of American films of 1972
