= List of Italian-American television characters =

The following is a list of notable Italian-American television characters.

To be included in this list, the character should be a main or frequently recurring character in a television series, and should have an article or section in Wikipedia. The character should be described as Italian-American in the text or categories.

Name	Show	Played by	Description
John Abruzzi	Prison Break	Peter Stormare	Mobster
Tony Almeida	24	Carlos Bernard	Systems analyst; Italian and Portuguese
Frank Angelino	Three's Company	Jordan Charney	Restaurateur; short-tempered
Jackie Aprile Jr.	The Sopranos	Jason Cerbone	Mobster
Jackie Aprile Sr.	The Sopranos	Michael Rispoli	Mobster
Richie Aprile	The Sopranos	David Proval	Mobster
Rosalie Aprile	The Sopranos	Sharon Angela	Mobster's widow
Chachi Arcola	Happy Days	Scott Baio	High school student
Bobby Baccalieri	The Sopranos	Steve Schirripa	Mobster
Sal Banducci	21 Jump Street	Sal Jenco	Police officer
Tony Banta	Taxi	Tony Danza	Cab driver, failed boxer
Vinnie Barbarino	Welcome Back, Kotter	John Travolta	Remedial high school student
Larry Barese	The Sopranos	Tony Darrow	Mobster
Tony Baretta	Baretta	Robert Blake	Police detective
Frank Barone	Everybody Loves Raymond	Peter Boyle	Retired bookkeeper; loud, reactionary
Marie Barone	Everybody Loves Raymond	Doris Roberts	Passive-aggressive housewife
Ray Barone	Everybody Loves Raymond	Ray Romano	Sportswriter
Robert Barone	Everybody Loves Raymond	Brad Garrett	Police officer
Luigi Basco	Life with Luigi	J. Carrol Naish, Vito Scotti	Sweet but gullible immigrant
Andrea Belladonna	Samantha Who?	Jennifer Esposito	Attorney; party girl, "shoulder devil"
Carmen "Carmy" Berzatto	The Bear	Jeremy Allen White	Gourmet chef, restaurateur
Natalie "Sugar" Berzatto	The Bear	Abby Elliott	Restaurant manager
Tony Blundetto	The Sopranos	Steve Buscemi	Mobster
Angie Bolen	Desperate Housewives	Drea de Matteo	"loving but tough Italian woman"
Nick Bonetti	Tequila and Bonetti	Jack Scalia	Police officer
Angie Bonpensiero	The Sopranos	Toni Kalem	Mobster's wife
Big Pussy Bonpensiero	The Sopranos	Vincent Pastore	Mobster
Alexandra Borgia	Law & Order	Annie Parisse	Assistant district attorney
Johnny Bravo	Johnny Bravo	Jeff Bennett (animated)	"muscular and boorish young man"
Artie Bucco	The Sopranos	John Ventimiglia	Restaurateur; mobster's friend
Charmaine Bucco	The Sopranos	Kathrine Narducci	Restaurateur; mobster's friend
Gina Calabrese	Miami Vice	Saundra Santiago	Police detective
Tony Calabrese	Police Story	Tony Lo Bianco	Police detective
Al Calavicci	Quantum Leap	Dean Stockwell	Admiral; womanizer
Tommy Carcetti	The Wire	Aidan Gillen	Ambitious politician; womanizer
Dominick Carisi Jr.	Law & Order	Peter Scanavino	Police detective
Lexie Carver	Days of Our Lives	Renée Jones	Police officer; mobster's daughter
Theo Carver	Days of Our Lives	Kyler Pettis	Mobster's grandson; autistic student
Anthony Ceccoli (Victor)	Dollhouse	Enver Gjokaj	Veteran with PTSD
Phil Cerreta	Law & Order	Paul Sorvino	Police detective
Ralph Cifaretto	The Sopranos	Joe Pantoliano	Mobster
Lieutenant Columbo	Columbo	Peter Falk	Police detective; quirky, brilliant
Frank Costanza	Seinfeld	Jerry Stiller	Businessman; angry, deranged
George Costanza	Seinfeld	Jason Alexander	Neurotic underachiever
Steve Crosetti	Homicide: Life on the Street	Jon Polito	Police detective
Jackie Curatola	Blue Bloods	Jennifer Esposito	Police detective
Ray Curto	The Sopranos	George Loros	Mobster
"Fat Tony" D'Amico	The Simpsons	Joe Mantegna (animated)	Mobster
Silvio Dante	The Sopranos	Steven Van Zandt	Mobster
Jeanie DaVinci	Mork & Mindy	Gina Hecht	Restaurateur
Remo DaVinci	Mork & Mindy	Jay Thomas	Restaurateur
Frank DeFazio	Laverne & Shirley	Phil Foster	Pizzeria owner
Laverne DeFazio	Laverne & Shirley	Penny Marshall	Bottlecapper
Anna Del Amico	ER	Maria Bello	Physician
Mike Delfino	Desperate Housewives	James Denton	Plumber, drug addict
Vinnie Delpino	Doogie Howser, M.D.	Max Casella	Girl-crazy sidekick
Andrew DeLuca	Grey's Anatomy	Giacomo Gianniotti	Physician
Dolly DeLucca	That's Life	Ellen Burstyn	Housewife
Frank DeLucca	That's Life	Paul Sorvino	Toll collector
Lydia DeLucca	That's Life	Heather Paige Kent	Working-class girl from New Jersey
Paulie DeLucca	That's Life	Kevin Dillon	Police officer
Al Delvecchio	Happy Days	Al Molinaro	Cook
Dominic Delvecchio	Delvecchio	Judd Hirsch	Police detective
Louie DePalma	Taxi	Danny DeVito	Cab dispatcher
Charlie DeSalvo	Highlander: The Series	Philip Akin	Martial arts instructor
Daniel Desario	Freaks and Geeks	James Franco	Good-looking bad boy
André DiMera	Days of Our Lives	Thaao Penghlis	Blackmailer
Chad DiMera	Days of Our Lives	Casey Jon Deidrick	Businessman; mobster's son
Stefano DiMera	Days of Our Lives	Joseph Mascolo	Mobster
Anthony DiNozzo	NCIS	Michael Weatherly	Cocky field agent; movie buff; flirt
Renée DuMonde	Days of Our Lives	Philece Sampler	Mobster's daughter, "evil home wrecker"
Manny Esposito	Cagney & Lacey	Robert Hegyes	Police detective
Nick Falco	Law & Order	Michael Imperioli	Police detective
Connie Falconeri	General Hospital	Megan Ward, Kelly Sullivan	Businesswoman; mobster's ex-girlfriend
Dante Falconeri	General Hospital	Dominic Zamprogna	Police detective; mobster's son
Olivia Falconeri	General Hospital	Lisa LoCicero	Businesswoman; mobster's mistress
Paul Falsone	Homicide: Life on the Street	Jon Seda	Police detective
Anthony Fanelli	The Fanelli Boys	Ned Eisenberg	Undertaker; nice guy
Dom Fanelli	The Fanelli Boys	Joe Pantoliano	Con man
Frankie Fanelli	The Fanelli Boys	Chris Meloni	Bartender; handsome playboy
Ronnie Fanelli	The Fanelli Boys	Andy Hirsch	College dropout
Theresa Fanelli	The Fanelli Boys	Ann Morgan Guilbert	Widowed mother
Joe Fontana	Law & Order	Dennis Farina	Police detective
Arthur Fonzarelli	Happy Days	Henry Winkler	Greaser, ladies' man
Frank Furillo	Hill Street Blues	Daniel J. Travanti	Police captain
Harry Garibaldi	Hill Street Blues	Ken Olin	Police detective
Mike Giardello	Homicide: Life on the Street	Giancarlo Esposito	FBI agent; Italian and black
Tony Giuliano	Night Court	Ray Abruzzo	Police detective
Furio Giunta	The Sopranos	Federico Castelluccio	Mobster
Paulie Gualtieri	The Sopranos	Tony Sirico	Mobster
Benjy Hawk	Days of Our Lives	Darrell Thomas Utley, Jim Lunsford	Mobster's son
Megan Hathaway	Days of Our Lives	Miranda Wilson	Mobster's daughter
Adriana La Cerva	The Sopranos	Drea de Matteo	Mobster's girlfriend
Paul LaGuardia	Cagney & Lacey	Sidney Clute	Police detective
Phil Leotardo	The Sopranos	Frank Vincent	Mobster
Janice Licalsi	NYPD Blue	Amy Brenneman	Mob-connected, murderous police officer
Angelo Lombardi	The Fanelli Boys	Richard Libertini	Priest
Dominic Luca	S.W.A.T.	Mark Shera	Police officer
Carmine Lupertazzi	The Sopranos	Tony Lip	Mobster
Carmine Lupertazzi, Jr.	The Sopranos	Ray Abruzzo	Mobster
Dave Malucci	ER	Erik Palladino	Incompetent physician
Jennifer Mancini	Melrose Place	Alyssa Milano	College dropout
Michael Mancini	Melrose Place	Thomas Calabro	Physician; womanizer
John Manicote	Hawaii Five-O	Glenn Cannon	Attorney General
Anthony Marentino	Sex and the City	Mario Cantone	Event planner
Zane Marinelli	The Beat	Mark Ruffalo	Police officer
Massimo Marone	The Bold and the Beautiful	Joseph Mascolo	Ruthless shipping magnate
Mario	The Super Mario Bros. Super Show!	Lou Albano	Plumber
Nick Marone	The Bold and the Beautiful	Jack Wagner	Businessman
Billy Martin	The Bronx is Burning	John Turturro	Yankees manager; Italian and Portuguese
Jennifer Melfi	The Sopranos	Lorraine Bracco	Psychiatrist
Samantha Micelli	Who's the Boss?	Alyssa Milano	Housekeeper's daughter; tough girl
Tony Micelli	Who's the Boss?	Tony Danza	Live-in housekeeper
Christopher Moltisanti	The Sopranos	Michael Imperioli	Mobster
Lorna Morello	Orange is the New Black	Yael Stone	Prison inmate from Boston
Donna Moss	The West Wing	Janel Moloney	White House aide; Italian and Irish
Dino Ortolani	Oz	Jon Seda	Mobster
Mikey Palmice	The Sopranos	Al Sapienza	Mobster
Chucky Pancamo	Oz	Chuck Zito	Mobster
Ernie "Coach" Pantusso	Cheers	Nicholas Colasanto	Dimwitted but lovable bartender
Patsy Parisi	The Sopranos	Dan Grimaldi	Mob accountant
Stacey Paterno	Spin City	Jennifer Esposito	Secretary from Brooklyn
Nathan Petrelli	Heroes	Adrian Pasdar	Senator with superpowers
Peter Petrelli	Heroes	Milo Ventimiglia	Paramedic with superpowers
Sophia Petrillo	The Golden Girls	Estelle Getty	Elderly widow
Tony Petrocelli	Petrocelli	Barry Newman	Defense lawyer
Donna Pinciotti	That '70s Show	Laura Prepon	High school girl with a wry wit
Bob Pinciotti	That '70s Show	Tanya Roberts, Don Stark	Jovial ladies' man
Eugene Pontecorvo	The Sopranos	Robert Funaro	Mobster
Carmine Ragusa	Laverne & Shirley	Eddie Mekka	Boxer, dancer
Lionel Rizzo	Kojak	Vince Conti	Police detective
Jane Rizzoli	Rizzoli & Isles	Angie Harmon	Police detective
Ann Romano	One Day at a Time	Bonnie Franklin	Divorced mother; "feisty"
Sal Romano	Mad Men	Bryan Batt	Art director; closeted
Roseanne Roseannadanna	Saturday Night Live	Gilda Radner	Brash, tactless anchorwoman
Tony Roselli	Remington Steele	Jack Scalia	Hunk
David Rossi	Criminal Minds	Joe Mantegna	FBI supervisory agent; Vietnam veteran
Frank Rossitano	30 Rock	Judah Friedlander	Mob-connected writer; slob
Alex Russo	Wizards of Waverly Place	Selena Gomez	Wizard; Italian and Mexican
Giada Russo	Wizards Beyond Waverly Place	Mimi Gianopulos	Italian-American Investigative Reporter
Jerry Russo	Wizards of Waverly Place	David DeLuise	Retired Owner of Waverly Sub Station
Justin Russo	Wizards of Waverly Place	David Henrie	Middle School Principal wizard; Italian and Mexican
Max Russo	Wizards of Waverly Place	Jake T. Austin	Owner of Waverly Sub Station; Italian and Mexican
Milo Russo	Wizards Beyond Waverly Place	Max Matenko	Italian and Mexican-American
Roman Russo	Wizards Beyond Waverly Place	Alkaio Thiele	Italian and Mexican-American
Tina Russo	Hill Street Blues	Megan Gallagher	Police detective
Johnny Sacrimoni	The Sopranos	Vince Curatola	Mobster
Dominic Santini	Airwolf	Ernest Borgnine	Aviator; war veteran
Jo Santini	Airwolf	Michele Scarabelli	Aviator
Dicky Santoro	Brooklyn South	Gary Basaraba	Police sergeant
Father Guido Sarducci	Saturday Night Live	Don Novello	Eccentric priest
Tony Scali	The Commish	Michael Chiklis	Police commissioner; family man
Tom Scavo	Desperate Housewives	Doug Savant	Advertiser, pizzeria owner
Melissa Schemmenti	Abbott Elementary	Lisa Ann Walter	Second Grade Teacher
Peter Schibetta	Oz	Eddie Malavarca	Mobster
Abby Sciuto	NCIS	Pauley Perrette	Forensic scientist; upbeat Goth girl
Anthony Soprano Jr.	The Sopranos	Robert Iler	Mobster's son
Carmela Soprano	The Sopranos	Edie Falco	Mobster's wife
Janice Soprano	The Sopranos	Aida Turturro	Mobster's sister
Junior Soprano	The Sopranos	Dominic Chianese	Mobster
Livia Soprano	The Sopranos	Nancy Marchand	Mobster's mother
Meadow Soprano	The Sopranos	Jamie-Lynn Sigler	Mobster's daughter
Tony Soprano	The Sopranos	James Gandolfini	Mobster
Ginnie Sorelli	Related	Jennifer Esposito	Ambitious attorney; main character
Vito Spatafore	The Sopranos	Joseph R. Gannascoli	Mobster
Alec Stone/D'Amico	New York Undercover	Josh Hopkins	Police detective; mobster's son
Sara Tancredi	Prison Break	Sarah Wayne Callies	Prison physician; drug addict
Elsbeth Tascioni	Elsbeth, The Good Wife, The Good Fight	Carrie Preston	Quirky lawyer, police detective
David Toma	Toma	Tony Musante	Police detective
Mike Torello	Crime Story	Dennis Farina	Police detective
Carla Tortelli	Cheers	Rhea Perlman	Surly barmaid
Nick Tortelli	Cheers	Dan Hedaya	Deadbeat dad
Nick Toscanni	Dynasty	James Farentino	Evil doctor
Joey Tribbiani	Friends	Matt LeBlanc	Dimwitted but lovable actor; ladies' man
Nona Valentine	Brooklyn South	Klea Scott	Police officer
Nick Vera	Cold Case	Jeremy Ratchford	Police detective
Charlie Verducci	Top of the Heap	Joseph Bologna	Scheming slum dweller
Vinnie Verducci	Top of the Heap	Matt LeBlanc	Scheming slum dweller
Anthony Zacchara	General Hospital	Bruce Weitz	Mobster; "homicidal maniac"
Claudia Zacchara	General Hospital	Sarah Brown	Mobster; "a very, very sexual woman"
Johnny Zacchara	General Hospital	Brandon Barash	Mobster's son, "bad boy with a good heart"
Dorothy Zbornak (née Petrillo)	The Golden Girls	Bea Arthur	Substitute teacher
Larry Zito	Miami Vice	John Diehl	Police detective

== Others ==
The following characters are presumably (but not verifiably) meant to be Italian-American.

Name	Show	Played by	Description
Nat Bussichio	Murphy Brown	Joe E. Tata	Restaurateur
Jordan Catalano	My So-Called Life	Jared Leto	Good-looking bad boy
Frank Fontana	Murphy Brown	Joe Regalbuto	Reporter
Lionel Fusco	Person of Interest	Kevin Chapman	Corrupt police detective
Danny Garibaldi	Grand Hotel (TV series)	Lincoln Younes	Waiter; amateur sleuth
Jess Mariano	Gilmore Girls	Milo Ventimiglia	Good-looking bad boy
Stan Rizzo	Mad Men	Jay R. Ferguson	Art director
Jeff Rosso	Freaks and Geeks	Dave Allen	Hippie guidance counselor
Peter Russo	House of Cards	Corey Stoll	Corrupt, alcoholic congressman
Frankie Stecchino	Boy Meets World	Ethan Suplee	High school bully
Donald Twinkacetti	Perfect Strangers	Ernie Sabella	Mean landlord

== See also ==
- Vito Scotti - Italian-American character actor who frequently appeared on TV.
- List of Italian-American actors
- Growing Up Gotti
- Jersey Shore
- Mob Wives
