= Jill Ker Conway =

Australian-American scholar and author (1934-2018)

Jill Ker Conway AC

7th President of Smith College
- In office 1975–1985
- Preceded by: Thomas C. Mendenhall
- Succeeded by: Mary Maples Dunn

Personal details
- Born: Jill Ker; 9 October 1934 Hillston, New South Wales, Australia
- Died: 1 June 2018 (aged 83) Boston, Massachusetts, U.S.
- Spouse: John Conway (d. 1995)
- Education: University of Sydney; Harvard University (PhD)
- Occupation: Writer

Academic background
- Thesis: The first generation of american women graduates (1969)

Academic work
- Discipline: History
- Institutions: University of Toronto; Smith College; Massachusetts Institute of Technology
- Writing career
- Genre: Autobiography
- Notable work: The Road from Coorain
- Notable awards: National Humanities Medal 2012

Jill Ker Conway AC (9 October 1934 – 1 June 2018) was an Australian-American scholar and author. Well known for her autobiographies, in particular her first memoir, The Road from Coorain, she also was Smith College's first woman president (1975–1985) and most recently served as a visiting professor at the Massachusetts Institute of Technology. In 2004 she was designated a Women's History Month Honoree by the National Women's History Project. She was a recipient of the National Humanities Medal.

== Biography ==
Ker Conway was born in Hillston, New South Wales, in the outback of Australia. Together with her two brothers, Ker Conway was raised in near-total isolation on a family-owned 73 square kilometres (18,000 acres) tract of land called Coorain (the Aboriginal word for "windy place"), which eventually grew to encompass 129 square kilometres (32,000 acres). On Coorain, she lived a lonely life, and grew up without playmates except for her brothers. In her early years, she was schooled entirely by her mother, with the aid of correspondence class material for her primary school and early grade school education.

Ker Conway spent her youth working the sheep station; by age seven, she was an important member of the workforce, helping with such activities as herding and tending the sheep, checking the perimeter fences and transporting heavy farm supplies. The farm prospered until it was crippled by a drought that lasted seven years. This and her father's worsening health put an increasing burden on her shoulders. When she was eleven, her father drowned in a diving accident while trying to extend the farm's water piping.

Initially Jill Ker Conway's mother, a nurse by profession, refused to leave Coorain. But after three more years of drought, she was compelled to move Jill and her brothers to Sydney, where the children attended school.

Ker Conway found the local state school a rough environment. The British manners and accent ingrained by her parents clashed with her peers' Australian habits, provoking taunts and jeers. This resulted in her mother enrolling her at Abbotsleigh, a private girls school, where Ker Conway found intellectual challenge and social acceptance. After finishing her education at Abbotsleigh, she enrolled at the University of Sydney, where she studied History and English and graduated with honours in 1958. Upon graduation, Ker Conway sought a trainee post in the Department of External Affairs, but the all-male committee turned down her application.

After this setback, she travelled through Europe with her now emotionally volatile mother. In 1960, she decided to strike out on her own and move to the United States. At age 25, she was accepted into the history program of Harvard University's Radcliffe College, where she devoted her studies to women's history, not yet an established historical discipline, and wrote her dissertation on Jane Addams and the establishment of Hull House. Her interest in Addams and Hull House was sparked by her neighbor and friend, former Librarian of Congress, Archibald Macleish. At Harvard, she also assisted a Canadian professor, John Conway, who was her husband from 1962 until his death in 1995. Ker Conway received her Ph.D. at Harvard in 1969 and taught at the University of Toronto from 1964 to 1975. Her book True North details her life in Toronto.

From 1975 to 1985, Ker Conway was the president of Smith College. After 1985, she was a visiting professor at the Massachusetts Institute of Technology. She received thirty-eight honorary degrees and awards from North American and Australian colleges, universities and women's organizations.

Throughout her career, Ker Conway served as director on a variety of corporate boards. These include stints of more than a decade on the boards of Nike, Colgate-Palmolive, and Merrill Lynch. Ker Conway was also the first female Chairman of Lendlease.

After 2011, Ker Conway served as the Board Chair of Community Solutions. It is a non-profit organization with a focus on homelessness and related issues, based in New York City.

Conway died on 1 June 2018 at her home in Boston at the age of 83.

== President of Smith College ==
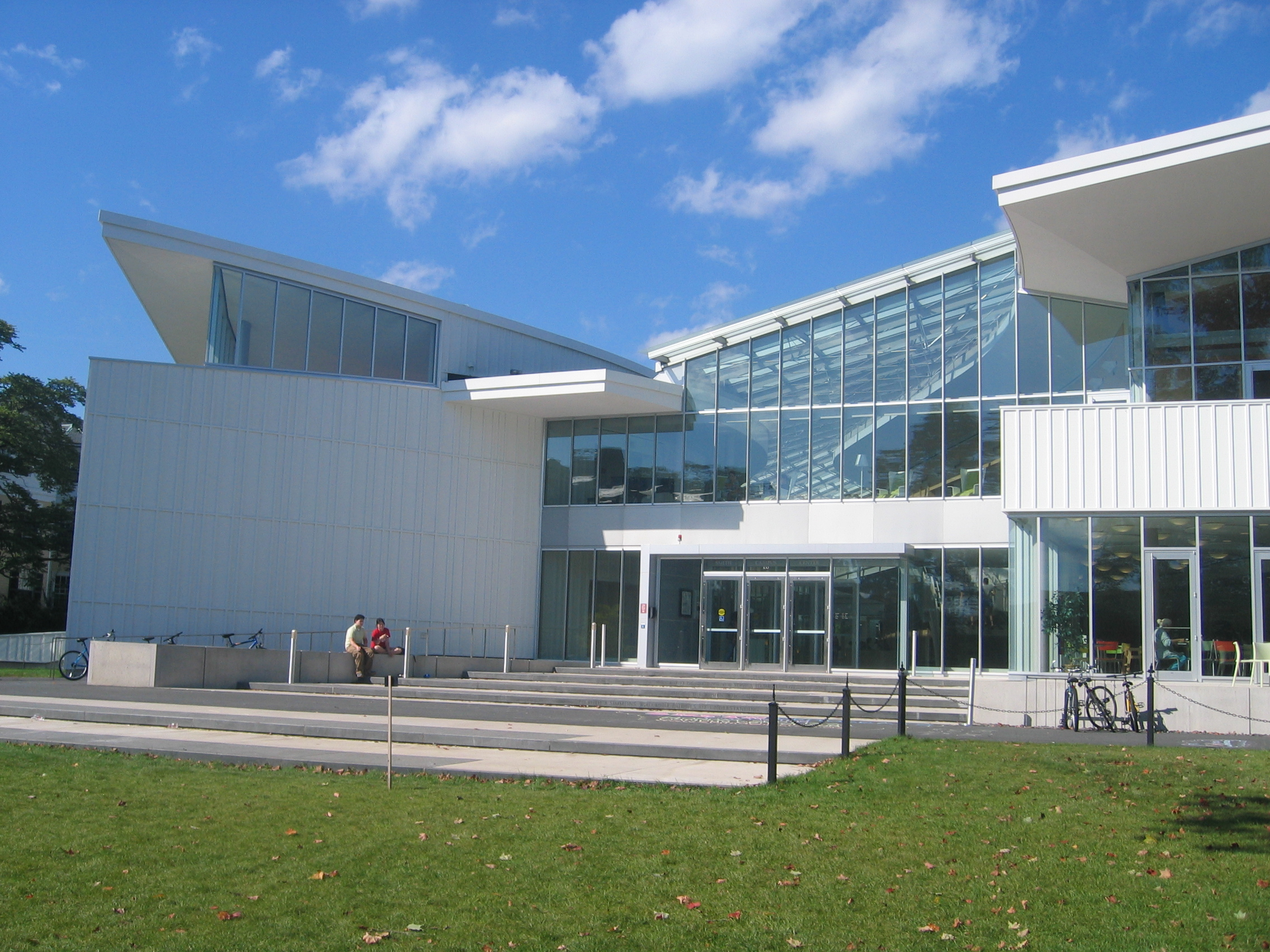
Smith College campus

In 1975, Ker Conway became the first female president of Smith College, the largest women's college in the United States. Located in Northampton, Massachusetts, Smith, a private liberal arts college, is the only women's college in the U.S. to grant its own degrees in engineering.

Ker Conway launched the Ada Comstock Scholars program, initially proposed by her predecessor Thomas Mendenhall. This program allows non-traditional students, many with work and family obligations, to study full or part-time, depending on their family and work schedules. These women can take classes for a bachelor's degree over a longer period of time. Conway House, dedicated in 2006, a residence for Ada Comstock Scholars was named in honor of Ker Conway.

One of Ker Conway's more notable accomplishments is a program she initiated to help Ada Comstock Scholars on welfare. At the time, many students who were also welfare mothers were not pursuing higher education, as accepting a scholarship would cause them to lose their welfare benefits. The mothers were forced to choose between supporting their children or furthering their education. By not giving them scholarships but paying their rent instead, Ker Conway circumvented the state's system. She also gave the students access to an account at local stores, access to physicians and so on. ABC's Good Morning America profiled graduates of the program, giving it national exposure. Eventually the state of Massachusetts, convinced about the importance of the program, changed its welfare system so that scholarship students wouldn't lose their benefits.

She also led the creation of the Smith Management Program (now called Smith Executive Education) and the Project on Women and Social Change. She worked to expand the curriculum leading to the development of programs in women's studies, comparative literature, and engineering. Conway took a keen interest in fundraising and under her presidency the endowment nearly tripled from $82 million to $222 million. These efforts enabled several large-scale projects including the construction of the Ainsworth Gymnasium, and expansion of the Neilson Library. The Career Development Office was also expanded under her tenure to better educate alumnae about career opportunities and graduate training.

In 1975, Jill Ker Conway was named by Time as a Woman of the Year.

== The Road from Coorain ==
Ker Conway started writing her first memoir after leaving Smith College, during her period at MIT. The Road from Coorain was published in 1989 (ISBN 0-394-57456-7) and details her early life, from Coorain in Australia to Harvard in the United States.

The book begins with her early childhood at the remote sheep station Coorain near Mossgiel, New South Wales. Ker Conway writes about her teenage years in Sydney and especially her education at the University of Sydney, where university studies were open to women but the culture was focused heavily on the men. She describes her intellectual development and later her feelings when she realizes that there is a bias against women; based upon her sex, she is denied a traineeship at the Australian foreign service.

In 2001, Chapman Pictures produced a television film, The Road from Coorain, featuring Katherine Slattery as the grown-up Jill and Juliet Stevenson as her mother.

== Awards and honors ==
- 1960 Jill Ker Conway was a 1960 Fulbright Postgraduate Scholar in History from the University of Sydney to Harvard University.
- 1975 In the first year of her presidency at Smith College, Conway was named a "woman of the year", one of a small group of notable women selected for that award by Time magazine.
- 1989 L.L. Winship/PEN New England Award, The Road from Coorain
- 2001 Inducted onto the Victorian Honour Roll of Women.
- Ker Conway was appointed a Companion (AC) in the General Division of the Order of Australia on 10 June 2013 for her eminent service to the community, particularly women, as an author, academic and through leadership roles with corporations, foundations, universities and philanthropic groups. On 12 June, she was removed as a 'Companion' and invested as an 'Honorary Companion' of the Order of Australia, because she no longer held Australian citizenship.
- On July 10, 2013, she received a 2012 National Humanities Medal from President Barack Obama.

== Legacy ==
In 2017 the John and Jill Ker Conway residence for veterans was opened in Washington DC.

== Selected bibliography ==
=== Books ===
- Conway, Jill Ker (1977). Modern Feminism: An Intellectual History. New York: Alfred A. Knopf. Archived from the original on 14 August 2014.
- ——; Kealey, Linda; Schulte, Janet E. (1982). The Female Experience in Eighteenth- and Nineteenth-Century America: A Guide to the History of American Women. New York: Garland Pub. ISBN 9780691005997.
- —— (1987). Utopian Dream or Dystopian Nightmare?: Nineteenth-Century Feminist Ideas about Equality. Worcester, Massachusetts: American Antiquarian Society. ISBN 9780912296890.
- ——; Scott, Joan W.; Bourque, Susan C. (1989). Learning about Women: Gender, Politics and Power. Ann Arbor, Michigan: University of Michigan Press. ISBN 9780472063987.
- —— (1989). The Road from Coorain (1st ed.). New York: Alfred A. Knopf Distributed by Random House. ISBN 9780749303600.

Reprinted as: —— (1992). The Road from Coorain (2nd ed.). London: Minerva. ISBN 9780749398941.

- —— (1992). Written by Herself: An Anthology. New York: Vintage Books. ISBN 9780679736332.
- ——; Bourque, Susan C. (1995). The Politics of Women's Education: Perspectives from Asia, Africa, and Latin America. Ann Arbor: University of Michigan Press. ISBN 9780472083282.
- —— (1995). True North: A Memoir. New York: Vintage Books. ISBN 9780679744610.
- —— (1992). Written by Herself: Autobiographies of American Women. An Anthology. New York: Vintage Books. ISBN 9780679736332.
- —— (1992). Written by Herself: Women's Memoirs From Britain, Africa, Asia and the United States, volume 2: an anthology. New York: Vintage Books. ISBN 9780679751090.
- —— (1998). When Memory Speaks: Reflections on Autobiography. New York: Alfred A. Knopf. ISBN 9780679766452.
- —— (1999). In Her Own Words: Women's Memoirs from Australia, New Zealand, Canada, and the United States. New York: Vintage Books. ISBN 9780679781530.
- ——; Kennan, Elizabeth; Munnings, Clare (2001). Overnight Float. New York: Penguin Books. ISBN 9780142000113.
- ——; Marx, Leo; Keniston, Kenneth (1999). Earth, Air, Fire, Water: Humanistic Studies of the Environment. Amherst: University of Massachusetts Press. ISBN 9781558492219.
- —— (2001). A Woman's Education. New York: Alfred A. Knopf. ISBN 9780679744627.
- —— (2006). Felipe the Flamingo. Illustrated by Lokken Millis. Golden, Colorado: Fulcrum Publishing. ISBN 978-1-55591-547-6.

=== Chapters in books ===
- Conway, Jill (1998), "Points of departure", in Zinsser, William (ed.), Inventing the truth: the art and craft of memoir, Boston: Houghton Mifflin, pp. 41–60, ISBN 9780395901502
- Conway, Jill (2001), "Foreword", in Freeman, Sue J.M.; Bourque, Susan C.; Shelton, Christine M. (eds.), Women on power: leadership redefined, Boston: Northeastern University Press, ISBN 9781555534783

=== Journal articles ===
- Ker, Jill (1960). "Merchants and merinos". Royal Australian Historical Society Journal. 46 (4). Royal Australian Historical Society: 206–233. Archived from the original on 14 August 2014.
- Conway, Jill (Winter 1971–1972). "Women reformers and American culture, 1870-1930". Journal of Social History. 5 (2): 164–177. doi:10.1353/jsh/5.2.164. Pdf.
