= The LSD Story =

- Dragnet episode
- Episode no.: Season 1 Episode 1
- Directed by: Jack Webb
- Written by: Jack Webb; (credited as John Randolph)
- Cinematography by: Andrew Jackson
- Editing by: William Stark
- Production code: 1
- Original air date: January 12, 1967
- Running time: 25 Minutes

Guest appearances
- Michael Burns as Benjie "Blue Boy" Carver; Art Balinger as Capt. Lou Richey; Olan Soulé as Ray Murray; Robert Knapp as Mr. Eugene Carver; Eve Brent as Mrs. Carver; Jerry Douglas as Sgt. Eugene Zappey; Alfred Shelly as Sgt. Dominic Carr; Johnny Aladdin as The Painter; Shari Lee Bernath as Sandra Quillan; Heather Menzies as Edna Mae Dixon; Lillian Powell (uncredited) as Landlady; Don Ross (uncredited) as Ben Riddle; Bruce Watson (uncredited) as Phillip Jameson

Episode chronology
← Previous —	Next → "The Big Explosion"

"The LSD Story" is an episode of the American television series Dragnet that appeared on the NBC network on January 12, 1967. It was written, produced and directed by Jack Webb, who also starred as Joe Friday. This was the first color episode broadcast of Dragnet and the first episode of the later series broadcast.

== Plot ==
Opening narration

"This is the city — Los Angeles, California. It's a fine place to enjoy life. There are places reserved just for kids... when they're young and feel young. Places they go when they're young and feel old... beginning the big search for something that often doesn't exist in the places they look for it. They might find it here [image of a church] or here [image of a synagogue] or maybe here [image of another church]. They could try looking here [image of Griffith Observatory]... their search might end with a college degree. One thing's sure — whatever they're looking for — it cannot be found inside a number five capsule. When they try, that's where I come in. I carry a badge."

"It was Tuesday, March fifteenth [1966]. It was fair in Los Angeles. We were working the day watch out of Juvenile Narcotics. My partner's Bill Gannon, the boss is Captain Richey. My name is Friday. A powerful new drug capable of producing weird and dangerous hallucinations had found its way onto the streets of the city. It had fallen into the hands of juvenile experimenters. We had to try and stop it."

Synopsis

A call comes into the Los Angeles Police Department juvenile narcotics division with a complaint of a person painted like an Indian and chewing the bark off a tree.

When detectives Joe Friday and Bill Gannon arrive at MacArthur Park, they find a boy with his head buried in the ground. The suspect is acting erratically and has half of his face painted blue and the other half yellow and identifies himself only as Blue Boy. A tussle ensues after the boy is read his Miranda rights and placed under arrest.

A doctor determines the boy is under the influence of an unknown drug and he's taken to the narcotics unit of juvenile division where he's questioned. The boy is found with several sugar cubes and states there's no law against the drugs he has taken. He continues to act erratically, so Captain Richey tells the detectives to bring the sugar cubes to the crime lab for analysis.

At the scientific investigation division, forensic chemist Ray Murray states that the drug is lysergic acid diethylamide tartrate, commonly known as LSD-25, that it was developed by a Swiss biochemist named Albert Hofmann, and it causes hallucinations, severe nausea along with aches and pains as well as anxiety and depression. Sergeant Friday states there are no laws to cover the use or sale of LSD.

Back at juvenile division, the boy is identified as Benjamin "Benjie" Carver. Benjie's parents are briefed about the situation, but they don't feel there's cause for concern and they don't want their son arrested. The father states that LSD is not illegal and Friday informs him that it's against the law to be in an intoxicated state under the influence of any drug. The father threatens to get his attorney involved and wants to take the boy home, so Captain Richey tells the detectives to book Benjie under the generic law; In danger of leading an idle, dissolute or immoral life, section 601 of the welfare and institutions code.

The case was heard in court several weeks later where Benjie is placed on probation and released to his parents. Two days later, Friday and Gannon join Sergeants Zappey and Carr in questioning two juveniles, Sandra Quillen and Edna Mae Dixon, who are high on LSD. The girls mention that they got the drugs from Blue Boy and then get sick. Sergeant Zappey relates that a bus on Sunset Strip will drive people up to Hollywood Hills to take the Acid Test for a dollar.

Over the next six months, acid becomes more popular. The captain informs the detectives that new state and federal laws have been passed, listing LSD as a dangerous drug. [This had, in fact, occurred on October 6, 1966.] A youth, Teddy Carstairs, is brought in for possession of LSD. He says he got the drugs from Blue Boy and is willing to testify to it. Friday and Gannon visit the Carver's home to pick up Benjie only to discover he moved out three months earlier. Benjie's mother apologizes to Friday for her earlier failure to cooperate with him.

Two months later and the detectives find Sandra and Edna Mae on Sunset Strip and find out that Blue Boy is having an acid party. They get the address and find several people high on acid including a painter eating paint off a paintbrush who tells them Benjie left. Friday calls in for officers to arrest the partygoers and finds out a drugstore has recently sold 3,000 empty pill capsules. At the drug store, the pharmacist, Ben Riddle, identifies Benjie as purchasing the empty capsules and gives them his address.

Friday and Gannon arrive at an apartment building and get a key to Benjie's apartment from the manager. Inside they find Benjie's friend, Phillip Jameson, and many drugs. Benjie is on the other side of the room motionless, having been that way for about an hour, and after telling Phillip he wanted to "get further out". Friday checks his pulse and declares, "Well, he made it. He's dead".

Closing narration

"The story you have just seen is true. The names were changed to protect the innocent. On December 15, a Coroner's inquest was held at the County Morgue, Hall of Justice, City and County of Los Angeles. In a moment, the results of that inquest."

"At the inquest, the coroner's jury ruled that the 18-year-old suspect had administered himself an overdose of lysergic acid diethylamide in combination with various barbiturates and had thus taken his own life." Text: "BENJAMIN JOHN CARVER - - Deceased."

== Reception ==
The Old-Time Dragnet Show with Adam Graham, writing in 2010, claims that this particular episode was voted #85 for "greatest TV episodes of all time" by TV Guide and Nick at Nite’s TV Land. Describing the social context, he says:

The show does a great job showing how those who are charged with enforcing the law are often frustrated by the law. It was also cutting edge in dealing with the issue of LSD in 1967 ... For some, this represented a hard hit back against the emerging counterculture ... Friday re-emerged as the rock solid hero we needed in a time when everything was shifting.

Scott Beale at Laughing Squid wrote, "It’s a bit ironic that the LSD episode is the first episode of Dragnet in color."

== Themes ==
- While the episode centers on the dangers of LSD, the climax shows that Benjie died not of an LSD overdose (which is nearly physically impossible), but rather a barbiturate overdose, which another character says was brought on by Benjie's desire to get "farther out." However, this does not state that the use of LSD does not have harmful effects, not limited to hallucinations, nausea, and high blood pressure which in themselves can be deadly.
- The plot of this episode was inspired by a real-life acid test in Watts. That event was chronicled by Tom Wolfe in his book The Electric Kool-Aid Acid Test. The band was the newly formed Grateful Dead. Merry Prankster Paul Foster, face painted half silver and half black, was arrested.

== See also ==
- Hippie exploitation films
