= List of Italian-American actors =

List of Italian American actors

To be included in this list, the person must have a Wikipedia article showing they are Italian American actors or must have references showing they are Italian American actors and are notable. As discussed in the 2005 book Hollywood Italians by Peter E. Bondanella, as well as numerous other sources, Italian-American actors have made a significant impact. The Guild of Italian American Actors was founded in 1937.

== Background ==
Some Italian-American film directors of the silent film era included Robert Vignola, Gregory LaCava, Frank Borzage (Borzaga) and Frank Capra. Italian-American actors included Enrico Caruso in the cultural legitimation of American silent cinema, to Rudolph (Rodolfo) Valentino.

The American film Renaissance (New Hollywood) in the 1970s coincided with Scorsese's Mean Streets (1973) and Coppola's The Godfather (1972), Giuliana Muscio attributes this to Italian Americans becoming better educated and more affluent after World War II.

Muscio connects the prominence of Italian-American director-actors to the Capocomico of traditional Italian theatre. Such director-actors include: Danny DeVito, John Turturro, Steve Buscemi, Vincent Gallo, Al Pacino, Stanley Tucci, Robert De Niro, Sylvester Stallone, Gary Sinise, Anne Bancroft, and Madonna.

== List ==
The list is organized chronologically, listing Italian American actors by birth date periods.

== 1880 ==
- Henry Armetta (1888–1945). movie character actor who appeared in at least 150 films, starting in silents as early as 1915. In 1938, he played in Everybody Sing with Judy Garland, Allan Jones, and Fanny Brice. In 1941, he was hilarious as the father of an Italian family shopping for beds in "The Big Store" with the Marx Brothers and Tony Martin. He appeared in at least 24 films in 1934 alone, sometimes uncredited.
- Eduardo Ciannelli (1888–1969) was an Italian baritone and character actor with a long career in American films, mostly playing gangsters and criminals
- Robert G. Vignola (1882–1953), born in Trivigno, Basilicata, Italy, one of the first Italian-American stars in cinema, later one of the silent screen's most prolific directors.

== 1890 ==
- Rudolph Valentino (1895–1926), nicknamed The Latin Lover, was born in Castellaneta, Apulia, Italy, and based in the United States. He starred in several well-known silent films including The Four Horsemen of the Apocalypse, The Sheik, Blood and Sand, The Eagle, and The Son of the Sheik.

== 1900s ==
- Don Ameche (Amici) (1908–1993) 50% Italian, actor and director
- Peter Brocco (1903 – 1992) was an American screen and stage actor. He appeared in over 300 credits, notably Spartacus (1960) and One Flew Over the Cuckoo's Nest (1975)
- Iron Eyes Cody (Espera Decorti) (1907–1999) son of Sicilian parents – actor, frequently played Native Americans
- Jerry Colonna (1904–1986) actor, entertainer, musician
- Russ Columbo (1908–1934) singer, violinist and actor, perhaps most famous for his signature tune, "You Call It Madness, But I Call It Love", and the legend surrounding his early death
- Lou Costello (Cristillo) (1906–1959) 62.5% Italian, 25% Irish, and 12.5% French – actor and comedian known as half of the comedy team of Abbott and Costello
- Renata Vanni (1909–2004) was born in Naples, Campania, Italy

== 1910s ==
- Robert Alda (Alfonso Roberto D'Abruzzo) (1914–1986) actor, father of Alan Alda
- Miriam Battista (1912–1980) daughter of Italian immigrants – child actress of the silent film era
- Ernest Borgnine (Borgnino) (1917–2012) Academy Award-winning actor
- Adriana Caselotti (1916–1997) actress known for providing the voice behind the lead character in Walt Disney's Snow White and the Seven Dwarfs
- Richard Conte (1910–1975) film actor
- Ann Corio (1914–1999) burlesque stripper and actress
- Alfred Drake (1914–1992) Born Alfred Capurro. Famous Broadway star of many hit musicals and plays.
- Dean Martin (Crocetti) (1917–1995) actor/singer, member of the Rat Pack
- Victor Mature (1913–1999) Italian father – film actor described as a "hunk" whose sculpted, classical features and curly hair resembled ancient Roman statues.
- Al Molinaro (1919–2015) son of Italian parents – actor (The Odd Couple, Happy Days)
- Vito Scotti (1918–1996), was an American character actor
- Frank Sinatra (1915–1998) his parents' Italian heritage included a Sicilian father and a mother from Liguria in northern Italy- actor and singer who many consider to be one of the finest male popular song vocalists of all time

== 1920s ==
- Kaye Ballard (Balotta) (1925–2019) stage and television actress
- Billy Barty (Bertanzetti) (1924–2000) film actor
- Tony Bennett (Benedetto) (1926–2023) popular music, standards, jazz singer and actor (The Oscar)
- Joseph Campanella (1924–2018) actor
- Timothy Carey (Agoglia) (1929–1994) Irish father and Italian mother – film and television character actor (Peeper)
- Richard Crenna (1926–2003) film actor (First Blood)
- Sergio Franchi (1926–1999) film actor and singer
- Yvonne De Carlo (Margaret Yvonne Middleton) (1922–2007) 25% Italian
- Linda Douglas (Mary Joanne Tarola) (1928–2017) her mother was a native of Alaska, born to Swedish immigrants, while her father was originally from Italy.
- Vince Edwards (Zoine) (1928–1996) actor, director, and singer
- Anthony Franciosa (Papaleo) (1928–2006) film/television actor, often billed as "Tony Franciosa"
- Lew Gallo (1925–2000), American actor, and producer
- Vincent Gardenia (Scognamiglia) (1922–1992) stage, film, and television actor
- Michael V. Gazzo (1923–1995) actor and Broadway playwright
- Mario Lanza (Alfredo Cocozza) (1921–1959) tenor and Hollywood movie star who enjoyed success in the late 1940s and 1950s
- Al Lettieri (1928–1975) film/television actor (The Godfather)
- Peggy Mondo (1927–1991) actress known for playing roles of overweight characters
- Henry Silva (1926–2022) actor of Sicilian and Spanish descent

== 1930s ==
- Danny Aiello (1933–2019) film/television actor
- Alan Alda (born 1936) actor, writer, director and political activist – father of Italian descent
- Anne Bancroft (Italiano) (1931–2005) Academy Award-winning actress
- Robert Blake (Gubitosi) (1933–2023) film actor, perhaps most famous for starring in the U.S. television series Baretta, and for being found not guilty of the murder of wife Bonnie Lee Bakley
- Joseph Bologna (1934–2017) film/television actor
- Ruth Buzzi (1936–2025), actress, singer and comedian
- Ron Carey (Cicenia) (1935–2007) film and television actor (Barney Miller)
- John Cazale (1935–1978) film actor (The Godfather) – father of Italian descent
- Dominic Chianese (born 1931) television actor (The Sopranos)
- Mary Costa (born 1930) American singer and actress, who is best known for providing the voice of Princess Aurora in the 1959 film, Sleeping Beauty.
- Bobby Darin (Cassoto) (1936–1973) actor, singer and one of the most popular rock and roll American teen idols of the 1950s – maternal grandfather was of Italian ancestry, unclear who Darin's biological father was
- James Darren (Ercolani) (1936–2024) television and film actor, television director, and singer
- Dom DeLuise (1933–2009) comic actor
- Connie Francis (Franconero) (1938–2025) actress and pop singer, known for her 1957 hit "Who's Sorry Now?"
- Ben Gazzara (1930–2012) son of Sicilian parents, film/television actor
- Joan Hackett (1934–1983) American actress of stage, television and film. Nominated for an Oscar for Best Supporting Actress in 1981, Italian mother
- Tony Lo Bianco (1936–2024) film and television actor (The French Connection)
- Robert Loggia (1930–2015), actor. He was nominated for the Academy Award for Best Supporting Actor for Jagged Edge (1985)
- Garry Marshall (Masciarelli) (1934–2016) Italian-American father and part Scottish mother—actor, director, and writer – brother of Penny Marshall
- Sal Mineo (1939–1976) son of Sicilian parents – actor and theater director known for his Academy Award-nominated supporting performances in Rebel Without a Cause and Exodus
- Tony Musante (1936–2013) stage, television, and film actor
- Dino Natali (born 1931), stage, television, and film actor
- Paula Prentiss (Ragusa) (born 1938) film actress – father of Italian ancestry
- Paul Sorvino (1939–2022) actor, father of Mira Sorvino
- Joe Spinell (1936-1989) actor, son of Italian immigrant parents
- Connie Stevens (Ingoglia) (born 1938) Italian father and Irish mother – actress and singer
- Dean Stockwell (1936-2021) italian american mother
- Marlo Thomas (born 1937) Lebanese father and Italian mother
- Joe Viterelli (1937–2004) actor, son of Italian immigrant parents

== 1940s ==
- Tony Sirico (1942–2022) portrayed Paulie Gualtieri in The Sopranos.
- Marc Alaimo (born 1942) television/film actor (Star Trek: Deep Space Nine)
- Armand Assante (born 1949) Italian father and Irish mother – film/television actor (Mambo Kings)
- Frankie Avalon (Avallone) (born 1940) actor and teen idol in the 1950s and early 1960s
- Joy Behar (Josephina Ochiuto) (born 1943) actress, comedian, co-host of The View
- Robert De Niro (born 1943) 25% Italian ancestry – two time Academy Award-winning American film actor, director, producer and founder of the Tribeca Film Festival (Goodfellas)
- Danny DeVito (born 1944) actor, director, Oscar nominated producer (Matilda)
- Dennis Farina (1944–2013) son of Sicilian parents – film/television actor (Get Shorty)
- Annette Funicello (1942–2013) actress, was Walt Disney's most popular Mouseketeer
- Bruno Kirby (Quidaciolu) (1949–2006) son of Sicilian parents – film actor (The Godfather Part II)
- Susan Lucci (born 1946) 50% Italian and part Swedish - Daytime Emmy Award-winning actress, who has been called "Daytime's Leading Lady" and "The Queen of Daytime"
- Patti LuPone (born 1949) singer and actress
- Joe Mantegna (born 1947) film/television actor (The Godfather Part III)
- Penny Marshall (Masciarelli) (1943–2018) Italian-American father and part Scottish mother – actress, producer and director, sister of Garry Marshall
- Lynne Marta (1945–2024), was an American actress and singer.
- Don Novello (born 1943), television/film actor
- Al Pacino (born 1940) son of Sicilian parents – Academy Award-winning film actor (The Godfather)
- Vincent Pastore (1946-2026) son of Sicilian parents – film/television actor, often cast as a mobster (The Sopranos)
- Joe Pesci (born 1943) Academy Award-winning actor, comedian and singer who is often typecast as a violent mobster or funnyman (Goodfellas, Casino)
- Bernadette Peters (Lazzara) (born 1948) actress and singer
- Gianni Russo (born 1943) actor. He is best known for his role as Carlo Rizzi in the 1972 film The Godfather.
- Susan Sarandon (born 1946) mother of Italian ancestry – Academy Award-winning film actress (Thelma and Louise)
- Vincent Schiavelli (1948–2005) was an American character actor described as an "instantly recognizable sad-faced actor", he was diagnosed with Marfan syndrome in childhood.
- Talia Shire (born 1946) film actress, sister of Francis Ford Coppola (Rocky)
- Nancy Sinatra (born 1940) singer and actress
- Bruce Springsteen (born 1949) 50% Italian, 25% Irish and part Dutch – singer and actor
- Sylvester Stallone (born 1946) film actor, director, producer, and screenwriter, best known for Rocky and Rambo
- Daniel J. Travanti (born 1940) son of Italian immigrants – film/television actor (Hill Street Blues)
- Victoria Vetri (born 1944) model and actress
- Tony Sirico (born 1942-2022) portrayed Paulie Gualtieri in The Sopranos.

== 1950s ==
- Danny Bonaduce (born 1959) Italian father – television actor (The Partridge Family)
- Lorraine Bracco (born 1954) Italian father and mother of French descent – Academy Award-nominated actress (The Sopranos, Goodfellas)
- Steve Buscemi (born 1957) Italian father and part Irish mother – actor (Fargo, Reservoir Dogs)
- David Caruso (born 1956) Italian father and Irish mother – film/television actor (CSI: Miami)
- Dennis Christopher (Carrelli) (born 1955) Italian father and Irish mother - actor (Django Unchained)
- Tony Danza (born 1951) actor/talk show host (Who's The Boss, Family Law)
- Vincent D'Onofrio (born 1959) son of Sicilian parents – film/television actor and director (Full Metal Jacket, Law and Order: Criminal Intent)
- Giancarlo Esposito (born 1958) Italian father and African-American mother – film actor
- Cristina Ferrare (born 1950) actress of Italian descent (The Impossible Years)
- Lou Ferrigno (born 1951) bodybuilder and actor (The Hulk)
- Robert Hegyes (1951–2012) television actor (Welcome Back, Kotter) Italian-American mother, Hungarian-American father
- Kathy Hilton (born 1959) Italian grandfather – actress (Happy Days)
- Cyndi Lauper (born 1953) Italian mother and Swiss/German father – singer and actress- (Girls Just Wanna Have Fun)
- Jay Leno (born 1950) Italian-American father and Scottish mother – comedian, former actor, known as host of The Tonight Show
- Nancy Linari (born 1955), voice, film and television actress.
- Ray Liotta (1954 - 2022) actor
- Madonna (Ciccone) (born 1958) father of Italian ancestry and mother of French-Canadian ancestry – singer, songwriter, dancer, actress, entertainer (A League of Their Own, Dick Tracy)
- Ed Marinaro (born 1950) actor and former football player
- Peter Onorati (born 1953) Italian mother and father
- Chazz Palminteri (born 1952) film actor (A Bronx Tale)
- Joe Pantoliano (born 1951) film/television actor (The Sopranos)
- Michelle Pfeiffer (born 1958) film actress, whose maternal grandfather was of Swiss-German-Italian extraction. Mother was born Donna Taverna.
- Joe Piscopo (born 1951) actor and comedian (Saturday Night Live)
- Victoria Principal (born 1950) father of Italian descent – actress (Dallas)
- Jon Polito (1950–2016) - actor. Notable television roles included Detective Steve Crosetti in the first two seasons of Homicide: Life on the Street
- Suzi Quatro (born 1950) Italian paternal grandfather
- Ray Romano (born 1957) actor and comedian (Everybody Loves Raymond)
- Isabella Rossellini (born 1952) Italian father and Swedish mother – actress, filmmaker, author, philanthropist, model
- Rene Russo (born 1954) Italian father and Italian maternal grandfather – film actress/model (Lethal Weapon 3, The Thomas Crown Affair)
- Jack Scalia (born 1950) film/television actor (The Genius Club)
- Steve Schirripa (born 1957) television actor and writer (The Sopranos) – father of Italian descent, and mother of Jewish descent
- Connie Sellecca (Sellecchia) (born 1955) actress
- Gary Sinise (born 1955) 25% Italian ancestry – actor (CSI: NY)
- John Travolta (born 1954) Italian-American father and Irish-American mother – Academy Award-nominated actor, singer, dancer (Grease, Saturday Night Fever)
- Steven Van Zandt (Lento) (born 1950) musician, songwriter, arranger, record producer, actor, and disc jockey (The Sopranos)
- Diane Venora, actress
- Vinny Vella (1947–2019) actor and part time comedian
- Chuck Zito (born 1953) member of the New York chapter of the Hells Angels, amateur boxer, martial artist, celebrity bodyguard, stuntman and actor

== 1960s ==
- Kristian Alfonso (born 1964) soap opera actress, Days of Our Lives
- Jennifer Aniston (born 1969) Italian maternal grandfather (Friends)
- Scott Baio (born 1960) television actor (Happy Days, Charles In Charge)
- Matt Battaglia (born 1965) Italian father and Anglo-American mother – actor
- Maria Bello (born 1967) Italian father and Polish mother – Academy Award-nominated film actress
- Valerie Bertinelli (born 1960) Italian father and British-American mother – actress (One Day At A Time)
- Jon Bon Jovi (Bongiovi) (born 1962) of Sicilian, Slovak, German, Russian ancestry – singer and film actor
- David Boreanaz (born 1969) Italian father and part Slovak mother – television actor (Buffy The Vampire Slayer, Angel, SEAL Team)
- Nicolas Cage (Coppola) (born 1964) Italian father and part German mother – 5 Academy Award-winning actor, director, and producer
- Christy Canyon (born 1966) Armenian-Italian descent — adult actress
- Federico Castelluccio (born 1964) Italian-born actor (The Sopranos)
- Michael Cerveris (born 1960) Italian father
- Damian Chapa (born 1963) mother is of Italian and German ancestry
- Donna D'Errico (born 1968) Italian father and British-American mother – actress and model
- Vic DiBitetto (born 1961), stand-up comedian, Internet personality, and actor. He often refers to himself as "The Donkey of Comedy,"
- Illeana Douglas (born 1965) mother of Italian ancestry – film actress
- Edie Falco (born 1963) Italian father and Swedish/English mother – actress (The Sopranos)
- Diane Farr (born 1969) of Italian and Irish descent – actress (Numb3rs, Fire Country)
- Jon Favreau (born 1966) mostly Italian and some French-Canadian father, and Jewish mother – actor and director (Rocky Marciano)
- Linda Fiorentino (born 1960) film actress (The Last Seduction)
- Joely Fisher (born 1967) Italian grandfather – film/television actress, daughter of Connie Stevens
- Tricia Leigh Fisher (born 1968) Italian grandfather – film/television actress, daughter of Connie Stevens
- Vincent Gallo (born 1961) independent film actor and director (Goodfellas)
- James Gandolfini (1961–2013) film/television actor (The Sopranos)
- Janeane Garofalo (born 1964) Italian father and Irish mother – stand-up comedian, actress, and political activist
- Paul Giamatti (born 1967) paternal grandfather of Italian ancestry – Academy Award-nominated film actor
- Frank Grillo (born 1963) of Italian heritage
- Anthony Michael Hall (born 1968) 25% Italian, 75% Irish – film/television actor, former teen star
- Marin Hinkle (born 1966) of Italian descent
- Glenn Scarpelli (born 1966) of Italian descent.
- Michael Imperioli (born 1966) film/television actor (The Sopranos)
- Michael Kelly (born 1968) mother is of Italian descent (Criminal Minds)
- Artie Lange (born 1967) 50% Italian, 25% German and 25% Native American – film/television actor, stand-up comedian and radio personality
- Matt LeBlanc (born 1967) Italian mother – television actor (Friends, Episodes, Man with a Plan)
- Ralph Macchio (born 1961) father of Italian and Greek descent, mother of Italian ancestry – film actor (The Karate Kid)
- Max Martini (born 1969) Italian father
- Tim McGraw (born 1967) 25% Italian – actor and country music singer
- Christopher Meloni (born 1961) Italian father and French Canadian mother – television actor (Law & Order: Special Victims Unit, Oz, Law & Order: Organized Crime)
- Danny Nucci (born 1968) Italian father and Moroccan Jewish mother – film actor (Crimson Tide)
- Erik Palladino (born 1968) Italian father and Armenian mother – actor (ER)
- Natalie Raitano (born 1966) television actress (V.I.P.)
- Salli Richardson (born 1967) African-American/American-Indian mother and part Italian father
- Mark Ruffalo (born 1967) Italian father and half French-Canadian, half Italian mother – critically acclaimed film actor, (Just Like Heaven, 13 Going On 30)
- Laura San Giacomo (born 1962) actress (Just Shoot Me!)
- Annabella Sciorra (born 1964) film/television actress (Jungle Fever)
- Nick Scotti (born 1966) actor, model and singer
- Terry Serpico (born 1964) Italian paternal grandfather
- Mira Sorvino (born 1967) Italian father and Anglo-American mother – Academy Award-winning actress, daughter of Paul Sorvino
- Gwen Stefani (born 1969) Italian father and part Irish mother – singer, fashion designer and actress
- Quentin Tarantino (born 1963) part Italian – film director and actor (Pulp Fiction)
- Marisa Tomei (born 1964) Academy Award-winning film actress (My Cousin Vinny)
- Stanley Tucci (born 1960) film/television actor (Shall We Dance)
- Paige Turco (born 1965) actress (Person of Interest)
- Aida Turturro (born 1962) actress, cousin of John Turturro (The Sopranos)

== 1970s ==
- Steve Burns (born 1973) host of Blue's Clues, born to an Italian mother and Anglo-Saxon father.
- Sasha Alexander (born 1973) television actress (NCIS, Rizzoli & Isles)
- Victor Alfieri (born 1971) Italian-born television actor
- Chad Allen (Lazzari) (born 1974) Italian father and Anglo-American mother – film/television actor (Dr. Quinn, Medicine Woman)
- Lauren Ambrose (D'Ambruoso) (born 1978) father of Italian descent and mother of German, Irish, and English descent – film/television actress (Six Feet Under)
- Lisa Ann (Corpora) (born 1972) of Italian and French descent – adult actress
- Leila Arcieri (born 1973) Italian father and African-American mother – actress and model
- Billie Joe Armstrong (born 1972) Italian great-great-grandparents
- Sara Bareilles (born 1979) of Italian, German, Portuguese, and French descent
- Jason Biggs (born 1978) father of English and Italian descent, mother of Italian descent – film and television actor (American Pie)
- Mike Birbiglia (born 1978) comedian, actor, and filmmaker of part Italian descent
- Danielle Bisutti (born 1976) actress and singer of Italian descent (True Jackson, VP)
- Cara Buono (born 1974) television actress (The Sopranos, Third Watch, Stranger Things)
- Eddie Cahill (born 1978) Italian mother and Irish father – film/television actor (Miracle, CSI: NY)
- Bobby Cannavale (born 1971) Italian-American father and Cuban mother – film/television actor (Third Watch)
- Michael Carbonaro (born 1976) actor, magician, and improv artist
- Linda Cardellini (born 1975) part Italian ancestry – actress
- John Cena (born 1977) Italian American actor and professional wrestler
- Tracee Chimo (born 1979) mother of Irish and Italian descent
- Jessica Collins (Capogna) (born 1971) film actress (The Young and the Restless)
- Mark Consuelos (born 1971) Mexican father and Italian mother (All My Children, Live with Kelly and Mark)
- Rachael Leigh Cook (born 1979) Italian mother and Anglo-American father – film actress (She's All That)
- Sofia Coppola (born 1971) Italian father – director, actress, and Academy Award-winning screenwriter, daughter of Francis Ford Coppola
- Drea de Matteo (born 1972) Emmy-winning actress (The Sopranos)
- Leonardo DiCaprio (born 1974) paternal grandfather of Italian ancestry – Academy Award winner (Titanic)
- Jennifer Esposito (born 1973) film/television actress (Spin City)
- Ben Falcone (born 1973) of Italian, English, German and Irish descent
- Joey Fatone (born 1977) pop singer and actor ('N Sync, My Big Fat Greek Wedding)
- Vanessa Ferlito (born 1977) actress (CSI: NY, NCIS: New Orleans)
- Johnny Galecki (born 1975) of Polish, Irish, and Italian descent
- Jennifer Gareis (born 1970) of part Italian descent – actress (The Young and the Restless, The Bold and the Beautiful)
- Luciano Giancarlo (1972–2007)
- Debbie Gibson (born 1970) of Italian, German and possibly Russian descent
- Aria Giovanni (born 1973) Italian-Yugoslavian father and French-German-Irish-West Indian mother — nude model and actress
- Joy Giovanni (born 1978) actress and former WWE wrestler
- Carmine Giovinazzo (born 1973) of partial Italian descent – film/television actor (CSI: NY)
- Carla Gugino (born 1971) father of Italian ancestry – film actress
- Lindsay Hartley (born 1978) Jewish father and mother of Greek and Italian descent – soap opera actress (Passions)
- Courtney Henggeler (born 1978) of Italian, Swiss-German and Irish descent - actress best known for her role as Missy Cooper in The Big Bang Theory
- Liza Huber (born 1975) maternal grandfather of Italian ancestry
- Bianca Kajlich (born 1977) mother of half Italian descent
- Joey Lawrence (born 1976) of part Italian descent
- Natasha Leggero (born 1974) of Italian descent
- Joe Lo Truglio (born 1970) Irish-Italian
- Domenick Lombardozzi (born 1976) of Italian heritage – actor
- Gina Lynn (born 1974) of Italian and Dutch descent – adult actress
- Joe Manganiello (born 1976) Italian father and Austrian-Armenian mother – movie and TV actor
- Alyssa Milano (born 1972), actress and activist
- Marisa Miller (Bertetta) (born 1978) paternal great-grandfather of Italian descent — model and actress
- Chris Messina (born 1974), actor, director, writer, and producer
- Kelly Monaco (born 1976) model and actress (General Hospital)
- Brittany Murphy (Bertolotti) (1977–2009) father of Italian ancestry – film actress
- Alessandro Nivola (born 1972) Italian paternal grandfather and Jewish paternal grandmother; his father was born in Italy – film actor (Face/Off, Goal!)
- Annie Parisse (born 1975) Italian ancestry on father's side
- Lana Parrilla (born 1977) mother is of Italian descent
- Chelsea Peretti (born 1978) father is Italian-American
- Gina Philips (born 1970) Italian father
- Zachary Quinto (born 1977) Italian father and Irish mother – film/television actor (Heroes, 24, Star Trek, Brilliant Minds)
- Stephen Rannazzisi (born 1977) of Italian and Irish descent
- Tara Reid (born 1975) part Italian ancestry
- Leah Remini (born 1970) Italian father and Jewish mother – film/television actress (The King Of Queens)
- Elisabeth Röhm (born 1973) Italian maternal grandfather
- Jai Rodriguez (born 1979) Italian mother and Puerto Rican father – actor and culture guide (Queer Eye for the Straight Guy)
- Adam Scott (born 1973) of Italian descent on his mother's side
- Amber Valletta (born 1974) paternal grandfather of Italian descent – actress (Revenge, Legends)
- Vince Vaughn (born 1970) Italian maternal grandfather – actor/producer
- Milo Ventimiglia (born 1977) father is of Italian descent – actor/producer (Heroes, Gilmore Girls, This Is Us)
- Cerina Vincent (born 1979) Irish-Italian father, Italian mother – nude model and actress (Not Another Teen Movie)
- John Lloyd Young (born 1975) mother of Italian ancestry – theater/film actor, Tony Award winner (Jersey Boys)

== 1980s ==
- Kevin Jonas (born 1987) from the Jonas Brothers is of Irish, Italian descent.
- Michael Angarano (born 1987) television/film actor (Sky High, Will & Grace)
- Justin Baldoni (born 1984) Italian father and Jewish mother – television actor (Jane the Virgin)
- Troian Bellisario (born 1985) father is of half Italian and half Serbian descent (Pretty Little Liars)
- Rachel Bilson (born 1981) Italian mother and Jewish father – film/television actress (The O.C.)
- Thora Birch (born 1982) of German, Italian, Scandinavian and French-Canadian ancestry
- Corbin Bleu (born 1989) Italian mother and Jamaican father – film/television actor (High School Musical)
- Francis Capra (born 1983) Italian and Dominican descent
- Gina Carano (born 1982) Italian descent – former MMA fighter and actress
- Aya Cash (born 1982) mother of Italian descent
- Loan Chabanol (born 1982)
- Lacey Chabert (born 1982) father is of 1/4 Italian descent
- Mark Copani (born 1981) Italian father and Jordanian mother – actor and professional wrestler
- Genevieve Cortese (born 1981) has Italian, French and Flemish ancestry
- Alexandra Daddario (born 1986) actress of mixed English, Hungarian, Irish, Slovak and Italian descent
- Matthew Daddario (born 1987) actor of mixed English, Hungarian, Slovak, Irish and Italian descent
- Majandra Delfino (born 1981) father of Italian descent (Roswell)
- Jessica DiCicco (born 1980) voice actress
- Dane DiLiegro (born 1988) father of Italian descent
- Chris Distefano (born 1984) stand-up comedian/actor
- Tiffany Dupont (born 1981) Italian father - actress
- Alexis Dziena (born 1984) has Irish, Italian and Polish ancestry (Invasion)
- Cameron Esposito (born 1981) Italian-American parents
- Chris Evans (born 1981) maternal grandfather of Italian ancestry – film actor (The Avengers, Fantastic Four)
- Briana Evigan (born 1986) maternal grandfather was of Italian ancestry (Step Up 2: The Streets)
- Alberto Frezza (born 1989) Italian-American actor (Station 19)
- Giacomo Gianniotti (born 1989) Italian father.
- Janine Harouni (born 1988) Lebanese-American father and mother of Irish and Italian ancestry.
- David Henrie (born 1989) maternal grandparents were Italian – television actor (How I Met Your Mother, Wizards of Waverly Place)
- Paris Hilton (born 1981) Italian great-grandfather – television/film actress (House of Wax)
- Brooke Hogan (born 1988) paternal grandfather of Italian ancestry
- Paul Iacono (born 1988) Italian-American parents
- Ellie Kemper (born 1980) Italian from her maternal grandfather, along with English, French, and German ancestry
- Katrina Law (born 1985) has German, Taiwanese and Italian ancestry – television/film actress (Spartacus: Blood and Sand, Hawaii Five-0, NCIS)
- Floriana Lima (born 1981) of Italian, Irish, English, Spanish and Portuguese descent
- Lindsay Lohan (born 1986) Irish and Italian ancestry – television/film actress (The Parent Trap, Mean Girls)
- Michelle Lombardo (born 1983) Italian father and Irish mother – actress and model
- Brooke Lyons (born 1980) has Italian, Irish and Portuguese descent
- Tina Majorino (born 1985) 25% Italian ancestry – film/television actress (Napoleon Dynamite, Veronica Mars)
- Kate Mara (born 1983) maternal grandmother of Italian descent (House of Cards)
- Rooney Mara (born 1985) maternal grandmother of Italian descent (The Girl with the Dragon Tattoo)
- Lea Michele (born 1986) Sephardic Jewish father and Italian Catholic mother; Michele was raised Catholic – (Glee)
- Kate Micucci (born 1980) Italian ancestry
- Cassandra Lee Morris (born 1982) voice actress of Italian descent
- Rachel Nichols (born 1980) 3/16ths Italian descent (through her mother)
- Dawn Olivieri (born 1981) Italian ancestry played Sarah Atwood in Yellowstone, and Amber Whalen in Lioness.
- Aleksa Palladino (born 1980) Italian ancestry
- Rosanna Pansino (born 1985) has Italian, Croatian, German, and Irish ancestry
- Shawn Pyfrom (born 1986) 12.5% Italian ancestry – television/film actor (Desperate Housewives)
- Christina Ricci (born 1980) father of half Italian ancestry – film actress (The Addams Family)
- Amber Rose (born 1983) has Italian, Cape Verdean, Irish and Scottish ancestry
- Dylan Ryder (born 1981) adult film actress of Italian and German descent
- Jason Schwartzman (born 1980) Jewish father and Italian mother – film actor, son of Talia Shire (Rushmore)
- Alia Shawkat (born 1989) mother is of Norwegian, Irish, and Italian descent
- Marina Squerciati (born 1984) of Italian descent (Chicago P.D.)
- Bobbi Starr (born 1983) Italian and Hungarian ancestry
- Steven Strait (born 1986) father is of English descent and mother is of Italian descent — model, singer, and actor (Sky High, Magic City)
- Brooklyn Sudano (born 1981) Italian father
- Taryn Thomas (born 1983) Italian ancestry
- Kate Voegele (born 1986) Italian ancestry
- Hsu Wei-ning (born 1984) Italian father
- Casey Wilson (born 1980) Irish and Italian heritage

== 1990s ==
- Annabelle Attanasio (born 1993) father is of Italian descent
- Madison Bailey (born 1999) Mauritian and Italian descent
- Sofia Black-D'Elia (born 1991) father is of Italian descent and mother is Jewish
- Belmont Cameli (born 1998) Italian ancestry
- Jake Cannavale (born 1995) Italian grandfather
- Gavin Casalegno (born 1999) Italian ancestry
- Michael Cimino (born 1999) of Italian-German and Puerto Rican descent
- Pete Davidson (born 1993) actor and comedian (Saturday Night Live)
- Ariana DeBose (born 1991) Puerto Rican, African-American and Italian ancestry
- Seychelle Gabriel (born 1991) father is of Mexican and French descent while mother is of Italian ancestry
- Leila George (born 1992) both parents (Vincent D'Onofrio and Greta Scacchi) are of Italian descent
- Elizabeth Gillies (born 1993) Italian grandmother — television and Broadway actress/singer (Victorious)
- Skyler Gisondo (born 1996) paternal grandfather of Italian descent
- Selena Gomez (born 1992) mother of Italian descent
- Ariana Grande (born 1993) television and Broadway actress/singer (Victorious)
- Rosabell Laurenti Sellers (born 1996) Italian father – actress (Game of Thrones)
- Aria Mia Loberti (born 1994) of Italian descent
- Ali Lohan (born 1993) part Irish and part Italian – television actress, musician
- Laura Marano (born 1995) father is of Italian descent – television actress (Austin & Ally)
- Vanessa Marano (born 1992) father is of Italian descent – television actress (Switched at Birth; Gilmore Girls; Without a Trace; The Young and the Restless)
- Vincent Martella (born 1992) television actor (Everybody Hates Chris; Phineas and Ferb)
- Julianna Rose Mauriello (born 1991) Italian father
- Dylan O'Brien (born 1991) of partial Italian descent – film/television actor (Teen Wolf; The Maze Runner)
- Victoria Pedretti (born 1995) three-quarter Italian father
- Brent Rivera (born 1998) of Mexican and Italian descent.
- Grace Rolek (born 1997) of African-American, Italian, Polish and Japanese descent
- Bonnie Rotten (born 1993) of Italian, German, Polish and Jewish descent – adult actress
- Cassie Scerbo (born 1990) full Italian ancestry
- Francesca Scorsese (born 1999) Italian father (Martin Scorsese) and French mother
- Rachel Sennott (born 1995) Italian and Irish descent
- Christian Serratos (born 1990) father is of Italian descent – film/television actress (Ned's Declassified School Survival Guide; The Walking Dead)
- Bella Thorne (born 1997) Cuban, Irish, and Italian descent (Shake it Up)

== 2000s ==
- Mika Abdalla (born 2000) Bulgarian, Lebanese, Greek, Italian, and German descent
- Francesca Capaldi (born 2004) Italian descent
- Cree Cicchino (born 2002) Italian and Ecuadorian ancestry
- Antonio Cipriano (born 2000) Lebanese and Italian descent
- Sofie Dossi (born 2001) Arab and Italian descent
- Alex Garfin (born 2003) Jewish father and Italian mother
- David Iacono (born 2002) Mexican, Italian and Puerto Rican descent
- Peyton Elizabeth Lee (born 2004) Chinese, English, Irish and Italian descent
- Chloé Lukasiak (born 2001) Polish, Scottish, German, and Italian descent
- Gaten Matarazzo (born 2002) Italian descent
- Romy Mars (born 2006) Italian, English, Irish and French ancestry
- Raymond Ochoa (born 2001) Mexican, Filipino, Italian, Irish and Russian-Jewish descent
- Izabela Rose (born 2006) African-American, Salvadoran and Italian descent
- Keen Ruffalo (born 2001) Italian and French Canadian father (Mark Ruffalo)
- Sadie Sandler (born 2006) Russian-Jewish and Italian descent
- Sunny Sandler (born 2008) Russian-Jewish and Italian descent
- Dominic Sessa (born 2002) Italian descent
- Mackenzie Ziegler (born 2004) Polish, German and Italian descent
- Maddie Ziegler (born 2002) Polish, German and Italian descent

== See also ==
- List of Italian American entertainers
- List of Italian Americans
- List of Italian-American television characters
