= The Road from Coorain (book) =

1989 memoir by Jill Ker Conway

- Author: Jill Ker Conway
- Language: English
- Genre: Memoir
- Publication date: 1989
- Followed by: True North

The Road from Coorain is a 1989 memoir by Jill Ker Conway.

The Road from Coorain was the first in Conway's trilogy of memoirs. True North (1994) is the story of her immigration to America in pursuit of intellectual fulfilment and a Harvard PhD in history. A Woman's Education (2001) tells the story of her move from history professor at the University of Toronto to the Presidency of Smith College.

== Synopsis ==
The book begins on the sheep station in the western grasslands of New South Wales, Australia, where Conway was born, 30,000 acres of grazing land that her parents settled in 1929. A severe drought and her father's death drove the family to Sydney, where Conway's struggle to get an education and make something of herself began.

== Adaptation ==
A television film adaptation of The Road from Coorain was broadcast on the ABC in 2002.
