= Luciano Giancarlo =

American film and television actor

Luciano Giancarlo (13 April 1972, Morristown, New Jersey – 16 July 2007) was an American film and television actor of Italian descent.

Born as Luciano Giancarlo Guizzardi and raised in Bologna, Italy, Giancarlo appeared in such TV shows and films as Gypsy Rose, What I Like About You, Gilmore Girls, Will & Grace, Out of Practice and Arrested Development. He also did voice work for the video game Medal of Honor: Vanguard.

He died of pneumonia and cancer at age 35.
