= The Road from Coorain (film) =

2002 American television film

- Based on: The Road from Coorain by Jill Ker Conway
- Written by: Sue Smith
- Directed by: Brendan Maher
- Starring: Juliet Stevenson; Katherine Slattery; Tim Guinee; Richard Roxburgh; John Howard; Bernard Curry; Sean Hall
- Theme music composer: Stephen Rae
- Country of origin: United States
- Original language: English

Production
- Producer: Penny Chapman
- Cinematography: Tristan Milani
- Editor: Suresh Ayyar
- Running time: 97 minutes
- Production companies: Chapman Pictures Pty, Ltd.

Original release
- Network: ABC
- Release: March 3, 2002

The Road From Coorain is the film adaptation of Jill Ker Conway's memoir of the same name. It was awarded an AFI award, Best Telefeature, Mini Series or Short Run Series in 2002.

== Cast ==
- Juliet Stevenson as Eve
- Richard Roxburgh as Bill
- Katherine Slattery as Jill (adult)
- Tim Guinee as Alec
- John Howard as Angus
- Bernard Curry as Bob
- Alex Tomasetti as Jill (teenage)
- Alexandra Galwey as Jill (child)
- Ewen Leslie as Reg
- Felix Williamson as Milton
- Harold Hopkins as Rob McLennan

== Reception ==
Reviews were very positive.

In response to requests for interviews, Conway's attorney responded that, "Ms Conway does not wish to be associated in any manner with the film." According to the filmmaker, Penny Chapman,"Ker Conway appeared especially displeased with a sex scene in the film because she believed it: 'turns a lyrical affair into a Peyton Place soap opera of lust'."
