= List of Hill Street Blues characters =

This is a list of characters from the NBC police drama Hill Street Blues.

== Main characters ==
Officers are listed by the rank they held at first appearance on the program; some officers later held higher ranks.

=== Captain Francis Xavier "Frank" Furillo ===
(Daniel J. Travanti, 1981–87)
Furillo is in charge of the Hill Street Precinct. He is honest, capable, and goes "by the book," though some of his colleagues find him a bit superior in attitude. He generally presents himself to be even-tempered, but on rare occasions he allows himself to get truly angry. Furillo joined the police force in 1964 and was a lieutenant at Division prior to his promotion to captain. He is generally quite well-versed in the intricacies of departmental policy. Though he was the protege of Police Chief-to-be Daniels, Furillo often disagrees with Daniels on policy and disdains his political gamesmanship. Frank is divorced from Fay Furillo, though he tolerates her histrionics and constant unannounced visits and helps her deal with her many problems. His relationship with Joyce Davenport, whom he affectionately calls "Counselor," is at first secret; by the end of season 3, they are married. The majority of episodes end with them in intimate situations, most of the time in bed, reviewing the events of the day. While on duty, Frank usually wears a three-piece suit; in one episode, (season 7, "Bald Ambition"), his colleagues are astounded by Frank wearing a sport coat (after which his wardrobe varies slightly from time to time). In the first season, Frank is revealed to be a recovering alcoholic; in season 4 he almost suffers a relapse after being stripped of his command on the orders of a vindictive Mayor Cleveland and he does relapse near the end of season 5, but quickly recovers and resumes attending Alcoholics Anonymous meetings in season 5's last episode.

In the first episode, Furillo speaks Spanish in a negotiation. He later demonstrates at least some knowledge of Italian when he calls his uncle in Italy.

=== Joyce Davenport ===
(Veronica Hamel, 1981–87)
Davenport works mainly as a public defender — she became an assistant district attorney for five months in season 5, but disliked it and rejoined the Public Defender's Office. She is a successful and well-respected attorney. Davenport is in a relationship with Captain Furillo, whom she refers to as "Pizza Man" as a term of endearment (she first used the term on screen in season 1, episode 2). They originally met during a court trial when Furillo was recently divorced and still a Lieutenant; their first date was to a (free) classical music concert, followed by pizza. Though the relationship is initially hidden, Davenport reveals the relationship in season 2 and they are married near the end of season 3. They have no children, as they learn in season 4 that she is medically unable to bear children (to the dismay of Furillo's mother).

=== Sergeant Philip Freemason "Phil" Esterhaus ===
(Michael Conrad, 1981–84)
Esterhaus is the desk sergeant, in charge of the uniformed officers, and is rarely seen outside of the station house. He is the only one at the station that calls Captain Furillo by his given name, Francis. Until season 4, each show opens with Esterhaus's morning briefing during roll call, which always ends with his catchphrase "Let's be careful out there." His speech is filled with complex syntax but his kindly and warm manner endears him to the officers who deeply respect him. While on duty, he maintains a calm and professional demeanor, but has lost his temper in a few extreme cases (such as when his treasured Buick was stolen). He passed the lieutenant examination four times, but never advanced in rank — three times due to budget limitations, and the fourth without explanation. Divorced from his first wife, he nearly marries his 18-year-old girlfriend at the end of season 1, until the appearance of Grace Gardner causes him to call off the marriage. He then begins a passionate relationship with Grace. Three seasons later, he dies during a romantic tryst with Grace; this was written due to Michael Conrad's death from urethral cancer on November 22, 1983.

=== Detective Michael "Mick" Belker ===
(Bruce Weitz, 1981–87)
An extremely capable undercover detective, Belker is small in stature yet strong, wiry, and very fast. He is Jewish. He exhibits a number of eccentricities, such as usually dressing in torn and dirty clothing, rarely shaving and frequently consuming onions, sardines and other pungent foods. Belker often growls and sometimes bites suspects (usually after they have attacked him first); he revealed that his father, a tailor who was also short of stature, tended to bite people during fights. Belker cares deeply for his parents; many episodes show Belker answering his station phone curtly with "Belker!" then softening as he says "Hi, Ma." Belker suffers the death of both his father (season 3, "Life in the Minors") and his mother (season 6, "Blues in the Night") during the course of the series. Belker addresses friends and foes alike with insults such as "dog breath" or "hair bag", and will threaten them with violence (for example, to "rip out [their] kidneys" or "collapse a lung") as an assertion of strength (his sister Luana, who appears in one episode, speaks the same way). He is loyal to and respectful of Captain Furillo, and has an almost filial feeling towards Sergeant Esterhaus. Originally a loner, Belker had multiple unsuccessful short-term relationships with women until he met and eventually married Officer Robin Tataglia. In season 6, Mick and Robin welcomed a son, whom they named Philip after Sergeant Esterhaus. Belker has had some unusual and serendipitous friendships, including movie actor John Gennaro in season 3, the deluded "superhero" Captain Freedom in season 2, and Eddie Gregg, a gay prostitute whom Belker arrests. Eddie leaves town after informing to Belker on his boyfriend, who had murdered some Peruvian drug dealers. Eddie returned in season 6 to tell Belker that he (Eddie) was dying of AIDS.

=== Sergeant (later Lieutenant) Henry Goldblume ===
(Joe Spano, 1981–87)
Goldblume is often in charge of negotiating in hostage situations. In the early years especially, he is portrayed as meek (emphasized by his wearing of a bow tie and his reluctance to draw his gun) and liberal, placing him at odds with Howard Hunter and his distinctly right-wing view of the world. As Goldblume's confidence increases over the course of the series, he becomes less of an adversary of Howard and more of a thorn in the side of Captain Furillo, who is constantly reminded of Henry's moral code and how it sometimes interferes with Furillo's difficult decisions. Nevertheless, Captain Furillo often uses Goldblume as a confidante, to the irritation of Lieutenant Calletano; this friction remains even after Goldblume is promoted to Lieutenant. Raised on 110th Street, he joined the police force in 1969 and was stationed at Jefferson Heights prior to his transfer to Hill Street. At the beginning of the series, he is married with two children, Josh and Annie; however, he and his wife Rachel undergo a separation after Henry has a short-lived affair. The separation ends after Rachel admits that she too once had an affair, but after Henry is shot during an undercover operation, his wife — who did not want him working undercover — divorces him. In season 4, Goldblume acted as Fay Furillo's labor coach, and briefly became her lover. He later forms a strong romantic relationship with the wealthy widow of a mob boss, only to witness her cold-blooded murder during a dinner date. He had aspirations to become a writer during high school, and is convinced to write his memoirs in season 7 following the tragic death of a former high school friend, who was also an aspiring writer.

In the last couple of seasons, Henry becomes hardened and somewhat cynical, and ceases wearing bow ties. He begins teaming with Norman Buntz on occasion, which would have been unthinkable in early seasons.

=== Officer Robert Eugene "Bobby" Hill ===
(Michael Warren, 1981–87)
Bobby Hill is a patrol officer who partners with Andy Renko. He is generally well-meaning and kind and makes extra effort to help less-fortunate citizens. He was previously stationed at Jefferson Heights. A trained boxer - fighting as Bobby "Blueberry" Hill - he twice won Golden Gloves championships and also twice won the Metro Police Middleweight Championship, though his attempt to win a third middleweight championship ended when he was knocked out in the final match. He is elected and briefly serves as the vice-president of the Black Officers' Coalition, but he disliked the politics and pressure of the position. In season 4, he wins $100,000 in the lottery and promptly loses all but $30,000 of it gambling. Unlike his partner, Hill does not aspire to plainclothes work. He and his partner are close friends and loyal to each other — though this is occasionally tested, as in the aftermath of their nearly fatal shooting in season 1.

=== Officer Andrew J. "Andy" Renko ===
(Charles Haid, 1981–87)
Partners with Bobby Hill, who calls him "Cowboy," even though he was born in New Jersey and says he has never been west of Chicago in his life. He speaks with a Southern accent and rides a motorcycle when he's not in a squad car. He favors country music and, in the early seasons, was often shown wearing a Waylon Jennings baseball cap and sometimes cowboy boots. Renko is an egocentric, gruff and sometimes taciturn man who rarely is shown smiling or laughing, even when others around him are telling jokes. He often indulges in semi-serious braggadocio to his fellow officers, who usually ignore him. He is quick to anger and sometimes displays emotional cruelty to women with whom he is romantically involved. In season three, a girlfriend breaks up with him saying she is tired of his bullying and trying to make her do things she doesn't want to do (in this case, drink more alcohol at a party when she said she had had enough to drink). Despite his frequent insensitivity towards others, he is emotionally needy, and lashes out at those close to him when he feels he isn't getting the attention he deserves (in one episode, when Hill begins a new relationship with a woman, Renko is jealous and angry with Hill; he reacts similarly when Hill is elected to the Black Officer's Coalition). Renko also does not respond well to criticism; in an episode where Captain Furillo is angrily reprimanding him for breaking protocol and potentially creating serious legal issues for the department, Renko dismissively says "Is that all?" and storms off, slamming the door behind him. Despite his behavior, he enjoys a close friendship with Hill and a good relationship with the other officers, who generally respect him. Towards the end of season 3, he mellowed considerably when he vowed to improve himself; his demeanor softened and he increasingly served as comic relief. Renko had a fractious relationship with his father, who was emotionally cold and abusive; he sincerely mourns when his father dies of cancer towards the end of season 2, but laughs when his body, dumped in an alley, is found by Belker. Renko aspires to become a detective, and has taken college courses towards that goal. In season 4, he marries and the couple have a daughter, but the marriage collapses after affairs on both sides in season 7.

=== Sergeant/Lieutenant Howard Hunter ===
(James B. Sikking, 1981–87)
Hunter, the commander of the Emergency Action Team (EAT, or "EATers"), loves to postulate and theorize about the degeneration of society. At the "chief's breakfast" in episode 11 of the first season, Daniels mentions in passing that Hunter has a PhD. A decorated Marine and a veteran of the Vietnam War, Hunter tends to speak in an overly complex manner similar to that of Sergeant Esterhaus; however, unlike Sergeant Esterhaus, he rarely thinks about or seems to understand the consequences of some of the things he says, especially relating to social, racial, or ethnic subjects and situations, and often comes across as patronizing and somewhat bigoted. When he speaks to Lieutenant Calletano, Hunter cheerfully infuses his speech with Spanish words and phrases, occasionally to the latter's mild irritation. Though generally suspicious of poor immigrants (sometimes calling them "third-world brown types"), he is very compassionate toward victims, whatever their background. In later episodes of the series, Hunter often expresses admiration and respect for ancient tribal practices and artifacts and is less patronizing.

Hunter is a very capable officer, skilled in unarmed combat (e.g., taekwondo) and an expert in weaponry; nevertheless, his handling of many an inanimate object (e.g., a paper towel dispenser) often results in comic situations. His attempts to acquire sophisticated weaponry (such as the PANDA "urban tank") often fail spectacularly and only serve to hinder his career ambitions (one such incident directly resulted in him being placed dead last on the captaincy list). Despite these mishaps, however, Hunter is held in high regard by almost everyone at Hill Street.

He initially butts heads with Henry Goldblume, a person on the opposite side of the spectrum politically and personality-wise. He sometimes has conflicts with Captain Furillo, believing that militaristic action is often the best solution to a situation, though he is bound by his loyalty to his superior, and Furillo respects his abilities. In later seasons he mellows somewhat, and prefers to resolve situations with as little violence as possible.

Often he has tried to find female companionship, but he has never been able to keep a steady significant other; the longest relationship he has had was with nurse Linda Wulfawitz in season 3. In season 4, he also had lunch dates with both Lucy Bates and Fay Furillo that proved major disasters. He joined the police department directly following his service in Vietnam, wearing badge 1146 in the Midtown Precinct; while there, he was compelled to serve as a bagman for dishonest officers, and the later revelation in season 4 of that activity embarrassed Hunter to the point of attempting suicide (an act circumvented by J.D. LaRue).

Initially a Sergeant, he is promoted to (or perhaps merely re-written as) Lieutenant early in season 1 without mention. In season 7, Hunter is involved in a controversial off-duty shooting and is demoted to sergeant; with the retirement of Jablonski he becomes the new desk sergeant, known for ending his Roll Call with a succinct "dismissed", before eventually being restored to Lieutenant and commander of the EAT. Throughout most of the series, he expresses admiration for Chief Daniels, supports him in disagreements and frequently tries to ingratiate himself. However, in the final episode, he tells Buntz that "Daniels doesn't care one bit about people like you and I".

=== Officer, later Sergeant Lucille "Lucy" Bates ===
(Betty Thomas, 1981–87)
For much of the series, Bates is the sole female officer given story lines. Initially depicted as overly emotional and self-conscious of her 6'1" stature, Bates is rewritten as a tough, capable officer when she is partnered with Joe Coffey. Bates and Coffey have a complicated relationship, and she is often critical of his off-duty behavior, but the two are nonetheless close and very supportive of each other. An effective officer, she occasionally encounters conflicts of conscience in her work (including one episode in season 2 where her compassion for a prostitute she was about to arrest caused her to turn her back while the girl shot up heroin and overdosed). Though she tries to be "one of the boys," she is often critical of her colleagues when they exhibit unprofessional behavior, and sometimes assumes on a "big sister" role. Her relationship with Coffey is strained after both take the Sergeant exam; Coffey claims it will be easy, does not prepare and as a result scores poorly, while the better-prepared Bates scores excellent and is promoted. After a brief stint as desk sergeant in season 4, following the death of Esterhaus, she returned to partnering with Coffey on motor patrol with the arrival of Sergeant Jablonski; she also assumed occasional desk sergeant duties during emergencies and following the reinstatement of Hunter's lieutenancy near the end of the series. Bates eventually adopts a child, Fabian, the biological son of a drug-addicted mother.

=== Detective John D. "J.D." LaRue ===
(Kiel Martin, 1981–87)
A talented undercover officer whose great detective skills are constantly marred by his poor choices: heavy drinking, womanizing, and frequent get-rich-quick schemes (such as "Saloondromat" — a bar and laundry — and his promotion of narcoleptic comic Vic Hitler). His recurrent battles with alcoholism have put him at odds with recovering alcoholic Captain Furillo, to the extent that Furillo nearly fired LaRue for arriving to a major undercover operation inebriated. Though his alcoholism eventually remains in check, he continues to have problems with Internal Affairs: J.D. cannot resist scams and constantly wants his friends to invest in schemes of questionable legality. LaRue is an inveterate practical joker, sometimes targeting Hunter's paramilitary escapades, but in one episode (season 5, "Washington Deceased") when the tables are turned on him, he is shown to be a poor sport. He has an adversarial relationship with Belker, who he frequently insults; he often comments without thinking, not realizing that such remarks make people angry with him.

=== Detective Neal Washington ===
(Taurean Blacque, 1981–87)
A former football player whose career ended due to a knee injury, Washington is the partner and best friend of LaRue. He is a very good undercover officer, much respected by his captain. Though Washington admits that he learned "almost everything I know" about undercover from LaRue, LaRue's drinking, schemes, and libido cause him no end of trouble. (He even feels compelled to remind LaRue on several occasions about the penalties for sex with minors, once when he facetiously said he had three words for his partner, "statue tory rape".) Neal's trademarks are a toothpick in the side of his mouth and a habit of referring to people as "babe" or, when he is angry, "sucker!" His nickname for his partner is "Lover." When frustrated by LaRue, he usually turns his head and mutters "Ohh, maaaaann..." He develops a promising relationship with a young woman during the sixth season, only to be shot in the back by her pre-teen son during an argument (an attack that he survives).

=== Lieutenant (later Captain) Raymundo "Ray" Calletano ===
(Rene Enriquez, 1981–86)
Colombian-born but a naturalized American citizen and former Marine, Calletano serves as Furillo's "right-hand man" and he has responsibility for staff and day-to-day precinct administration. His fluency in Spanish often comes in handy, especially in dealing with Hispanic youth gangs such as the Diablos. Ray's relationship with Howard Hunter is sometimes awkward, as Hunter likes to use Spanish words show camaraderie with Ray but he comes off as unintentionally patronizing. Though Ray has reached the rank of lieutenant and Furillo depends on him on a daily basis, Ray's leadership abilities are sometimes called into question (even by Furillo himself). Ray is jealous of the attention lavished by Furillo on Henry Goldblume. When he is eventually promoted to captain of the Polk Avenue Precinct, he is proven to be a poor leader, and an explosion of racial tensions at Polk Avenue result in him being relieved of command and made an advisor to Chief Daniels. By the end of the series, Ray has resigned from the force and is instead providing Spanish-language training to the police department.

=== Chief Fletcher Daniels ===
(Jon Cypher, 1981–87)
The chief of police – formerly an inspector and the captain of the 23rd Precinct – has many officers reporting to him, but he seems to pay special attention to Frank, partly because he had worked with Frank before he became chief and partly because Hill Street is the most dangerous precinct in the city. Daniels respects Furillo's integrity, though it often frustrates him as it interferes with what he considers effective policy or political expediency. Several times he accuses Frank of disloyalty. Though not provably corrupt, Daniels is an opportunist and a cheap politician with very little conscience. Because of his traditional approach to police work (which includes a lack of interest in the civil rights of suspects), Daniels finds a kindred spirit in Howard Hunter, though Hunter is not always within the Chief's inner echelon. (By the end of the series, Hunter disdains Daniels and tells Buntz "Daniels doesn't care one bit about people like you and I.") Ray Calletano finds the Chief particularly irritating. Daniels also never remembers Henry’s last name, often calling him every other name with “Gold” as a prefix. Daniels is often concerned about the status of racial diversity in the department, though his worry is related solely to the image of the department rather than to a genuine concern for civil rights. Daniels' wife is first referred to as Anne, then as Cora. His wife eventually divorces him, after which he sexually harasses Detective Mayo and tries to have her fired when she rejects his advances. Despite this, at the beginning of season 6, Mayo has begun a romantic relationship with Daniels, though she soon breaks it off.

=== Officer Joe Coffey ===
(Ed Marinaro, 1981–86)
A patrol officer and Vietnam War veteran who is partnered with Lucy Bates. Lucy is attracted to Joe, but critical of his promiscuous behavior. The two are close and supportive of each other, but frequently squabble. Joe is well-liked by his colleagues. Because of his large stature, he is often chosen to break down doors when necessary. During a trip to Las Vegas, he shows a potential for gambling addiction and goes so far as to steal money from Belker (who is passed out drunk) to continue playing. Coffey forms a close friendship with Bates' adopted son. He holds the unusual distinction of being killed twice during the course of the series; his first death was changed into a severe injury when the producers decided to make him Bates' regular partner.

=== Fay Furillo ===
(Barbara Bosson, 1981–86)
Frank's emotionally needy ex-wife. In early seasons, she made frequent visits to the precinct house to harangue Frank about things such as alimony, child support, the exploits of their son Frank Junior and her own life problems. In season 3 after one such outburst had begun, Furillo lost his temper and forced her to come to terms with the fact that since they were no longer married, she shouldn't keep coming to him for solutions. She then became less shrill and developed new life interests; she also became involved with and pregnant by Judge Paul Grogan and delivered a baby girl in season 4. Fay later became romantically involved with Goldblume in season 4 and, to a lesser extent, Detective Garibaldi. Her relationship with Joyce Davenport is covered infrequently during the series, but after a rocky start (especially when Frank Junior appeared to prefer Joyce to his mother), they seem to have come to an understanding and even a friendship, though not a close one. Occasionally, when he is defending his ex-wife to a third party, Furillo will mistakenly refer to Fay as his wife. Despite her seeming neediness, Fay is rarely intimidated by anyone and openly challenges others frequently; she takes karate lessons in season 4 that prove effective on one occasion. Her screen time was dramatically reduced, and ultimately eliminated during season 6.

=== Sergeant Stanislaus "Stan"/"Stosh" Jablonski ===
(Robert Prosky, 1984–87)
An "old school" cop who takes over from Sergeant Esterhaus after the latter's death. He is transferred from Polk Avenue after a physical altercation with a female officer, replacing Bates as desk sergeant in the process. Well-respected by the officers, though he does not inspire the emotional bond that Esterhaus did. He lives alone except for his dog, Blackie. Instead of urging his officers to "be careful out there," he encourages his people to "do it to them before they do it to us"; in season 6, he changes this to "They're getting away out there!" Jablonski is stubborn, enjoys police work and dislikes that his age affects his ability to go out on motor patrol. His angina progresses to a heart attack early in season 7, requiring coronary artery bypass surgery and forcing him into retirement. Post-retirement, he continues to spend time with his former colleagues during their off duty hours and occasionally provides assistance when the opportunity arises.

=== Detective Harry Garibaldi ===
(Ken Olin, 1984–85)
A transfer from the Midtown Precinct, Garibaldi is willing to bend rules to make a bust. He spends his nights in law school classes, juggling his schedules so that he can complete law school in four years. Partners with Detective Mayo. Fatally stabbed in season 6 while heavily in debt to loan sharks from gambling losses.

=== Detective Patricia "Patsy" Mayo ===
(Mimi Kuzyk, 1984–85)
Much more "by the book" than her partner, Detective Garibaldi, and very defensive of her police practices. Well respected by her peers. She approached the married Captain Furillo, who politely declined a romantic relationship. Chief Daniels became infatuated with her in season 5 after reviewing a videotape of her being undressed by a predatory dentist; when Mayo rebuffed his advances, Daniels tried to have her kicked off the force, until Furillo intervened. At the beginning of season 6 she appears only occasionally, and also enters into a brief romantic relationship with Chief Daniels, much to the surprise of Furillo and the other officers.

=== Lieutenant Norman "Guido" Buntz ===
(Dennis Franz, 1985–87)
Buntz is an effective officer with a natural detective's sense, but he often takes shortcuts and makes use of morally questionable tactics. He tends to dress in mismatched clothing and speaks in a distinctly working-class manner with a heavy Chicago accent (similar to Elwood Blues in The Blues Brothers). He also makes use of colorful imagery and uses as much profanity as television would allow at the time. His "Guido" nickname was used by people at his prior precinct, but nobody at Hill uses it. On his first day at Hill, he convinces a captain of the Polk precinct to retire so that Ray Calletano can take the position and leave the Hill, allowing Buntz to take Calletano's staff responsibility and make Buntz' job easier. Buntz develops a working relationship with Sid the Snitch, who feeds him information about major criminals. At one point he unwittingly becomes entangled with his dishonest previous partner from Midtown precinct, who is shaking down loan sharks for money; Buntz eventually tells him corrupt behavior is why he transferred out of Midtown and tells his friend he never wants to see him again. Buntz is frequently the target of internal investigations; in one case, a corrupt Internal Affairs investigator sets Buntz up, using Buntz's record to lend support to the setup. In the last episode, he punches Chief Daniels — who had been publicly calling for his dismissal — in the face. After being fired, he moves to Beverly Hills, California with Sid and becomes a private investigator — the premise of the short-lived spin-off Beverly Hills Buntz. Buntz is similar in personality to Franz's previous character on Hill Street Blues, corrupt Detective Sal Benedetto of Midtown Vice, though he is less violent and exhibits greater moral character. The little-used "Guido" nickname is a nod by the writers to this prior role.

=== Officer Patrick Flaherty ===
(Robert Clohessy, 1986–87)
Transfers to Hill Street in season 7. At his prior precinct, he turned in his corrupt partner, who was a friend of Lieutenant Buntz; as a result, Buntz dislikes and constantly needles him. Romantically linked with Officer Russo (who refuses to be seen in public with him, resulting in their breakup) and later, Grace Gardner.

=== Officer Celestina "Tina" Russo ===
(Megan Gallagher, 1986–87)
Transfers to Hill Street in season 7. An able patrol officer, Tina also works undercover from time to time, which is how she first comes into contact with J.D. (who is unaware that she is also a police officer). Russo gets into some trouble for having sex with a criminal whom she is investigating, rather than merely "seducing" him at length. Later mentored by Belker; briefly linked romantically with Flaherty, though she is reluctant to make their affair public.

== Other characters ==
Assistant D.A. Irwin Bernstein (George Wyner, 1982–87)

(Pronounced "Bern-steen.") Often faces off against Joyce Davenport in court. Recruited Davenport to the District Attorney's office in Season 5. Known to refer to himself as "Mrs. Bernstein's son" when making a point. In Season 6, Bernstein is part of Captain Furillo's commission on corruption, which secures indictments against more than three dozen officers and lays blame on Chief Daniels as well. He confesses his attraction to Joyce Davenport and kisses her in Season 7. Leaves Hill Street in the last episode for a private practice in Los Angeles.

Commander (later Mayor) Ozzie Cleveland (J.A. Preston, 1982-1987)

Originally introduced as the commander of the powerful Midtown Precinct, Cleveland was also the president of the Black Officers' Coalition, and he nominated Bobby Hill to the vice-presidency of the BOC. When mayoral candidate Councilman Benjamin Fisk dies in an ironic and tragic accident ten days before the election, Cleveland enters the race and - assisted by Fletcher Daniels' mishandling of a police shooting and Deputy Chief Mahoney's last-minute revelations of Daniels' role in trying to cover up that shooting - wins election in a landslide. He has a particular hatred of drug dealers - having grown up constantly exposed to them in a poor area of the city - and invests significant political capital in "Operation Stop 'n' Cop", a sweep operation that nearly costs Furillo his command. Cleveland's own son, Lee, is revealed to be a junkie; while Ozzie wants Lee out of his life, his wife Leona still supports him. Cleveland later survives an assassination attempt engineered by former Captain Jerry Fuchs.

Officer Leo Schnitz (Robert Hirschfeld, 1981–85)

The "khaki" officer in charge of booking. He wears glasses, is overweight, and is in a rather unhappy marriage. Leo attempts to save a drug addict named Rico, staying with him in a jail cell until he gets straight, but Rico eventually relapses. After his wife leaves him, Leo loses quite a bit of weight and later on elopes to New Zealand with the female "khaki" officer, Natalie.

Grace Gardner (Barbara Babcock, 1981–85)

The widow of Chief of Detectives Sam Gardner, Grace is hired to improve the appearance of the Hill Street stationhouse and immediately falls for Phil Esterhaus. Her erotic desires seem to know no end and, even in public, she sometimes appears to be restraining the throes of passion. Briefly partnered with Hunter before returning to Esterhaus. Esterhaus eventually expires while in her bed, and she becomes a nun. Unable to avoid the temptations of the flesh, she leaves the nunnery and becomes a field representative for a condom company.

Jesus Martinez (Trinidad Silva, 1981–87)

Introduced as the warlord of the Diablos youth gang, Martinez often works with Furillo if he can gain an advantage for himself. Serves time in jail after he uses a government grant to play the futures market, loses all the money, and tries to recoup his losses by stealing the police payroll. He renounces his gang colors after his marriage, enrolls in law school (using forged documents). Despite Martinez's long list of violent crimes, Furillo develops a thinly concealed respect for his big ideas and his clever readings of people.

Captain Jerry Fuchs (Vincent Lucchesi, 1981–84)

Introduced as the Captain in charge of Vice when it was based out of the Midtown Precinct. He is a tough cop with a New England accent, and was a former "drinking buddy" of Furillo before Furillo swore off alcohol. Fuchs is not well respected by his superiors or his own people, who consider being under Fuchs' command a license for officers to do anything they want. His department is found to be pervasively corrupt, leading to its dissolution. Fuchs quits rather than be fired and sets up his own private investigation firm. Fuchs attempts to kill Mayor Cleveland and then suffers a heart attack while trying to flee to Saint Louis, Missouri; he dies in the hospital.

Alan Wachtel (Jeffrey Tambor, 1982–87)

Introduced as a sleazy and unscrupulous attorney who occasionally hangs around the Hill Street precinct, Wachtel attended law school with Joyce Davenport, where he was one of the best students in the class. After a period of wearing dresses to "explore his gender identity", he eventually becomes a judge courtesy of political patronage and, after a rough start, quickly becomes more "by-the-book," but also more cynical.
His name was originally pronounced WAKH-tull, later as wakh-TELL.

Sgt. / Lt. Alf Chesley (Gerry Black, 1981–84)

A soft-spoken sergeant who is promoted to lieutenant after serving for many years on the force. Bobby Hill wants him to take a more active role in the Black Officers' Coalition, but Alf declines and politely lectures him on how long he has waited for advancement and how many movements dedicated to affirmative action he has seen come and go. After his promotion, Alf is given more responsibility but is hardly ever an integral part of a story. Not seen after season 3.

Captain Freedom (Dennis Dugan, 1982)

A superhero "wannabe" who crosses paths with Belker on several occasions. He gives inspirational speeches to Belker about society and the power of the human mind and spirit, though they are invariably followed by a statement that reveals him to be insane. Killed when he attempts to intervene in an armed robbery of a bar set up for a police corruption investigation.

Officer Robin Tattaglia Belker (Lisa Sutton, 1982–87)

Originally transferred to Hill Street in Season 2. Ingratiated herself to Detective Belker when she agreed to accompany him on visits to his incapacitated father. Pursued an on-again, off-again relationship with Belker until becoming pregnant by him in Season 6 and marrying him later that season.

Detective Sal Benedetto (Dennis Franz, 1983)

Previous character of Dennis Franz, the corrupt Detective from Midtown Vice is famous for three events: blindsiding Renko with a sap during a brawl behind a bar, being severely beaten by Hill in revenge, and committing suicide in a bank's safe-deposit area when his corruption is discovered (after one of his schemes nearly gets Washington killed).

Officer Mike Perez (Tony Pérez, 1981-1985)

A street cop who is generally well-liked by the other members of the precinct. He speaks both English and Spanish fluently. In the episode "Doris in Wonderland" (S4E5), he shoots a child whom he mistakes to be a prowler. His recovery from the tragedy is slow and painful. In "Of Human Garbage" (S5E13), Perez rescues several children from an apartment fire and is quickly recognized for it by Chief Daniels. It is later revealed - after Perez's informant and his wife come forward - that Perez paid his informant to set the fire. In the aftermath of this revelation, Captain Furillo had Perez admitted to a psychiatric hospital for observation, while Chief Daniels denounced officer Perez to the media and placed him on indefinite suspension.

Officer Kate McBride (Lindsay Crouse, 1986-1987)

Introduced after the death of Coffey and partners for three episodes with Lucy Bates. Her father was a police officer who was killed in the line of duty when she was a child. She eventually comes out of the closet as a lesbian, though she fears rejection from her fellow officers. Not seen again until the next season, when she is awarded a medal of valor after a violent shootout with a criminal. Buntz becomes something of a mentor to her, notes her guilt surrounding the circumstances behind her award and offers wisdom and emotional support .

Natalie DeRoy (Ellen Blake, 1984–87)

A "khaki officer" brought in to assist Leo Schnitz in Season 4. She is efficient and has a wry sense of humor. Natalie develops strong feelings for Leo, which are sometimes manifested as half-serious jabs at his character or appearance. Despite her interest in him, Leo long maintains feelings for his estranged wife. Eventually, however, Natalie and Leo elope to New Zealand.

Fabian DeWitt (Zero Hubbard)

The adopted child of Lucille Bates, whom she first encountered during a shoplifting incident. Despite his harsh upbringing, Fabian quickly turns into a happy and well-behaved child and, later, teenager. Like Lucy, he is very close to Joe Coffey.

Vivian DeWitt (Beverly Hope Atkinson)

Fabian’s birth mother. A hooker and a junkie who abandons Fabian and later makes an unsuccessful effort to get him back.

Gina Srignoli (Jennifer Tilly, 1984–85)

Widow of a mobster and paramour to Lieutenant Goldblume, Gina was shot by an assassin for acting as a police informant and died in Goldblume's arms. She left Goldblume $1.1 million, from which Goldblume received $80,000 after settling encumbrances with the IRS.

Detective Manny Rodriguez (Del Zamora, 1985)

Celeste Patterson (Judith Hansen, 1985–86)

Sid "The Snitch" Thurston (Peter Jurasik, 1985–87)

Ally to Lieutenant Norman Buntz; originally seen in the company of LaRue, Washington, and Belker in an undercover operation, after which he was arrested. Despite the fact that he interacts with dangerous criminals, Sid is most often a comic character, annoying his associates on both sides of the law with his grating manner. Sid wears loud clothing and is constantly broke and seeking any amount of money from Hill Street officers in exchange for information. He speaks in a roundabout manner, one apparently designed to lightly disguise descriptions of illegal activity, though he rarely conceals anything successfully. Fearing for his life as a known snitch, Sid relocates to Los Angeles as Norman Buntz's assistant in Beverly Hills Buntz.

Jack Ballantine (Gary Miller, 1982–87)

Howard Hunter's right-hand man. He rarely has much to say except in response to Lt. Hunter's orders or theories. Inwardly, however, he begins to harbor deep resentment toward Hunter. This state of affairs is completely unknown to Hunter or the audience until it is shown that he is responsible for some petty thefts of Howard's property. Once caught, Ballantine has a complete psychotic break that includes armed hostage-taking.

Hector Ruiz (Panchito Gomez, 1981–85)

A junior member of the Diablos youth gang, Ruiz on three separate occasions takes hostages in an attempt to better his position. Frank and Joyce frequently intercede in hopes of saving him from a life of crime. Unfortunately, when Ruiz takes mayoral candidate Benjamin Fisk hostage in retaliation for not being named head of the Diablos (while Jesus Martinez was in jail), Ruiz is shot and killed by an EAT sharpshooter.

Vic Hitler (Terry Kiser, 1983)

A part of a three-episode story arc in the third season, Vic Hitler is arrested for excessive fines in parking tickets. He quickly reveals himself to be a stand-up comic of the "old school," with rapid fire one-liners that send the Hill Street cops into stitches. After many failures (due to Vic's insistence on using the Hitler name), LaRue finally manages to get Vic an engagement at a disreputable nightclub. Vic is initially a success, only to then reveal – unintentionally, in mid-performance – that he is a narcoleptic.

Judge Lee Oberman (Larry D. Mann, 1983–85)

A no-nonsense judge who presides over numerous arraignments. He is balding with thick glasses and bushy eyebrows, and has a generally judicial demeanor. Oberman is impatient of what he feels to be baseless arrests, but never seems to raise his voice. He can also be merciful and kind without being maudlin.

Judge Maurice Schiller (Allan Rich)

A judge often seen at arraignments, once given the nickname "Let-'em-go Moe", referencing his emphasis on correct police procedure. More irascible than Judge Oberman. Schiller is slightly disheveled looking, often wearing an ordinary shirt under his robe. He is a football fan and he once called a recess so that he, Joyce, and the other court officers could watch the end of a game in his office. Despite his friendliness with Joyce, however, he publicly (and with vitriol) berated her from the bench in the third season premiere episode "Trial by Fury" for improper conduct, and threatened to have her jailed if it ever happened again.

Judge Milton Cole (George D. Wallace)

A white-haired, bow-tie wearing judge with a reputation for harsh sentencing ("Heads-Will-Roll Cole"). To the shock of the Hill Street cops, Cole is caught picking up a payoff from a bus station locker and also accepting a bribe. He is forced to resign in disgrace and it is mentioned, almost in passing, that he commits suicide not long afterward.

Alan Branford (Martin Ferrero)

A perpetrator who is sometimes arrested owing to the dangers caused by his impersonations of The Cisco Kid, Cochise, and Rambo on the streets. Always defended, via chance, by Joyce Davenport. Though he is mostly a comic character and is treated mercifully by the officers and by judges, he can also display a frightening side when he does not get his way; in one instance taking Fay Furillo hostage at a soup kitchen serving Thanksgiving dinner.

Deputy Chief Warren Briscoe (Andy Romano)

A tough, high-ranking officer who often supervises Furillo. Though Furillo is loyal to the department, he is always hesitant to carry out the policies of Briscoe when he feels Briscoe is merely trying to spare the department embarrassment or, alternately, gain some good publicity for the department. Furillo's actions tend to work out better in the end than what Briscoe proposed; nevertheless, Briscoe views Furillo as arrogant and self-righteous. He is loyal to the chief, though nowhere near as cynical.
The same actor also played a police captain named Roger McPherson in one episode.

Wally Nydorf (Pat Corley 1982-86)

A county coroner who, because of budget shortages and lack of staffing, is constantly behind in his work. Known as having once been a brilliant medical examiner. Though Nydorf is polite to visiting police officers and infuses gallows humor into his conversation, he can turn on a dime and become loud, impatient, and irascible.

Rob Nelson (Louis Giambalvo)

Rob is the husband of J.D.'s sister Peggy. He runs a car lot, and his business practices are often called into question, as is his devotion to Peggy. J.D., ever the opportunist, often approaches Rob when Rob is in a tough situation (such as when he is arrested for soliciting a prostitute), and promises him help, but only in exchange for a free car. J.D.'s schemes involving Rob almost always fall through in one way or another.

James Logan (Nick Savage)

A pickpocket and purveyor of stolen merchandise who is frequently arrested by Belker. Apart from his last appearance, he gives Belker a fake name, usually a comical one which refers to his merchandise. When in possession of stolen skiing equipment, for instance, he claims to be named Jean-Claude Killy; when arrested with stolen golf equipment, he claims his name is Sam Snead. Shot and killed in Season 4; he died in Belker's arms.

Cpl. Jock Buchanan (1981–87)

A patrol officer who is often seen in the background. He has a mustache, a strong jaw, and his blonde hair is a bit on the long side. He gives the impression of being a bit older than most of the other cops. Buchanan, apparently one of only a couple of corporals in the precinct, almost never has a line that rises above the background noise.

Officer Art Delgado (Jerome Thor, 1982)

A police officer who is referenced in passing several times, but is first seen with regard to a commission investigating corruption. Delgado has 29 years on the force but, due to a one-year leave of absence, only has seniority for 19. Very close to the end of his career, he has a breakdown and is unable to function (though he remains alert and personable). His brother officers sign him in and out as if he were still on duty, resulting in one of the very few cases of improper behavior on the Hill, if not the only one, that Furillo allows to continue. Furillo, however, considers his and his officers' activity an act of compassion.

"Buck Naked" Gilbert (Lee Weaver, 1981–87)

Famous for appearing almost randomly, opening his trenchcoat, and yelling, "I'm Buck NEKKID!" So frequently did he make this exclamation that he was once booked as "Buck Naked". At one point he is a material witness in a murder trial, but he destroys his credibility after testifying by exposing himself to the judge. Known to prefer turkey dinners, as ham "disconveniences (his) stomach"; also insists on polyester or wool blended fabric (when he does wear clothes) as "wool scratches me up". He is once arrested and placed in a cell with a number of other inmates, at which point he delivers the following address: "Fellow Americans: I wanna address you on the subject of 'rights'! We got human rights. We got 'in-unALIENable' rights! We got the right to bear arms! An' I got a right to bare my po' black ass!" Predictably, he disrobes after this.

== Gangs in Hill Street Blues ==
Gang culture was a feature in all seven seasons beginning with the first episode. Several storylines related to gang life, and the different approaches to negotiation, in particular by officers such as Furillo, Goldblume, Hunter, and to a lesser extent those of the uniform or plain clothes detective ranks.

Interactions included multiple gang meetings held at the precinct to negotiate "turf" boundaries and truces in exchange for facilitating a presidential visit that did not come to pass or the return of a governor's pet dog. The gang/police meetings more often formed part of the comic rather than the dramatic elements of the series.

Gang interactions mostly centered around the Hispanic gang Los Diablos, and the fragile but productive and increasingly trusting relationship between its leader Jesus Martinez and Furillo, who even attends Martinez' wedding. Martinez, the only gang character given any extended development, moves through the series from early and relapsing belligerence, to negotiation, to finally renouncing his gang colors and qualifying as a paralegal.

David Caruso had a recurring role (1981-1983) as Tommy Mann, the leader of Irish street gang Shamrocks, in the early years of the series.

Danny Glover had an early career appearance in the first four episodes of season two as Jesse John Hudson, erstwhile leader of the Black Arrows, whose stated aim to "go straight" turned out to be hypocritical when he attempted to take back control of the gang with violence and murder.
