= National Trust Community Investment Corporation =

The National Trust Community Investment Corporation (NTCIC) is a private, for-profit subsidiary of the American National Trust for Historic Preservation, founded in 2000 and based in Washington, DC.

NTCIC is a tax credit syndicator. It operates by forming a legal partnership with a developer of historic real estate that results in NTCIC making an equity investment in the project in exchange for receiving rights to the federal tax credits generated by the rehabilitation of the property. NTCIC then furnishes the tax credits to a corporate entity that can use the tax credits to defray its federal income tax liability. The same can be done with state historic tax credits in states that have that legislation. Combining state and/or federal historic tax credits with the federal New Markets Tax Credit is also a possibility if the project is located in a low-income census tract.

Syndicating historic tax credits can be a significant advantage for developers, especially those who do not have sufficient tax liability to claim the tax credits themselves. The "selling" of tax credits is also a useful means to acquire cash up front, that can be poured into the project once the partnership is formed, rather than waiting until federal or state taxes are filed and processed. This option is particularly attractive for nonprofit developers of real estate, such as nonprofit organizations, which do not pay taxes. Tax credit syndicators such as NTCIC can structure agreements that enable these nonprofit entities to still benefit from the federal credits.

The result is that developers are able to "make the numbers work", enabling the rehabilitation of older and historic structures and ensuring that these pieces of America's cultural fabric will endure for future generations.
