= 1981 Jersey City mayoral election =

1985 Jersey City mayoral election
- June 16, 1981
Candidate	Gerald McCann	Wally Sheil
Party	Nonpartisan	Nonpartisan
Popular vote	33,440	23,919
Percentage	58.3%	41.7%
Mayor before election
Thomas F. X. Smith
Nonpartisan
Elected mayor
Gerald McCann
Nonpartisan

The 1981 Jersey City mayoral election was held on June 16, 1981. Incumbent mayor Thomas F. X. Smith ran for governor of New Jersey instead of seeking a second consecutive term in office. In the open race to succeed him, city councilman Gerald McCann defeated state senator Wally Sheil.

A preliminary election was held on May 12. McCann and Sheil advanced over a large field of challengers, including councilman Anthony R. Cucci and police chief James Cowan, who joined with McCann in opposing Sheil. The Sheil campaign received a boost in the runoff campaign when Cucci switched sides, claiming that McCann had offered him a $50,000 bribe. However, Sheil suffered a major setback when he lost his June 2 primary election for the Senate to attorney Edward T. O'Connor Jr. Two weeks later, McCann easily won the election.

This was the first time in Jersey City history that the runoff election had attracted higher turnout than the preliminary election.

== Background ==
In 1977, Thomas F. X. Smith was elected mayor of Jersey City in a surprising upset which ousted the incumbent administration of Paul T. Jordan. Jordan, who had been running for governor of New Jersey, withdrew his campaign following the defeat in the municipal elections. Smith's political organization included Jersey City State College administrator Wally Sheil, who was elected to the New Jersey Senate on his ticket, defeating Democratic incumbent James P. Dugan in the primary election. Although Sheil and Smith split in 1980, weakening the political machine they had built, Smith supported Sheil's campaign for mayor in 1981.

== Candidates ==
- James Cowan, chief of the Jersey City Police Department
- Anthony R. Cucci, member of the Jersey City Council (Democratic)
- Gerald McCann, member of the Jersey City Council (Democratic)
- Wally Sheil, state senator (Democratic)

== Primary election ==
=== Campaign ===
During the primary campaign, Cowan, Cucci, and McCann joined in opposition to Sheil and the county political machine. Referring to their movement as "Solidarity," in homage to the Polish trade unionist movement of the same name, they sought to deny Sheil a first-ballot victory. They also backed U.S. representative Robert A. Roe in the gubernatorial primary against Mayor Smith. Although all of the candidates were members of the Democratic Party, McCann had endorsed Ronald Reagan for president in 1980.

=== Results ===
In the preliminary election on May 12, Sheil led the field with approximately nineteen thousand votes, followed by McCann with sixteen thousand and Cucci with fifteen thousand. Because no candidate received a majority of the vote, Sheil and McCann proceeded to a run-off election.

The opposition to Sheil received 66 percent of the vote, suggesting that Sheil was unlikely to win the runoff unless he could gain support from Cucci. Sheil's poor showing was seen as a blow to Mayor Smith which was reminiscent of Jordan's defeat in 1977, suggesting that Smith did not have the firm grip on the city or county necessary to win election as governor.

== Runoff election ==
=== Campaign ===
The campaign intensified during the runoff election. McCann compared Sheil to the infamous former political boss Frank Hague. Despite his earlier alliance with McCann, Cucci endorsed Sheil and claimed that McCann had offered him a $50,000 bribe to allow a contractor to dump waste on a city lot. McCann denied the accusation, and the Sheil campaign ran advertisements calling on McCann to refute the statements while subject to a polygraph.

A decisive moment in the runoff campaign came on June 2, when primary elections for state offices were held. Sheil, who was running for re-election to the state Senate in parallel to his campaign for mayor (as permitted under state law at that time), was defeated by Edward T. O'Connor Jr. Mayor Smith also finished sixth in the gubernatorial primary, although he carried Hudson County. The results were encouraging to the insurgent, anti-organization movement supporting McCann.

There was a legal effort to permit write-in candidates by an ad hoc committee, which claimed that a number of voters were opposed to both candidates and "were disenfranchised because there was no way they could record their protest through the voting process," but the committee's appeal was rejected in court.

Both campaigns spent heavily, though by Election Day, the McCann campaign had run out of money for advertisements and voter mobilization.

=== Runoff results ===
Candidate	Votes	Percent
Gerald McCann	33,440	58.30%
Wally Sheil	23,919	41.70%
Votes	57,359	100.00%
