= 1992 Jersey City special mayoral election =

- November 3, 1992
- Turnout: 74.86%
Candidate	Bret Schundler	Louis Manzo	Marilyn Roman
Party	Nonpartisan	Nonpartisan	Nonpartisan
Popular vote	10,681	8,914	7,691
Percentage	17.6%	14.7%	12.7%
Candidate	Joseph Charles	Willie Flood	James A. McLaughlin
Party	Nonpartisan	Nonpartisan	Nonpartisan
Popular vote	7,205	6,216	6,037
Percentage	11.9%	10.2%	10.0%
Candidate	Allen Manzo	Jaime Vazquez
Party	Nonpartisan	Nonpartisan
Popular vote	4,591	3,922
Percentage	7.6%	6.5%
Mayor before election
Joseph Rakowski
Nonpartisan
Elected mayor
Bret Schundler
Nonpartisan

The 1992 Jersey City special mayoral election was held on November 3, 1992. The election filled a vacancy created when mayor of Jersey City Gerald McCann was convicted on federal criminal charges. It was noted for the large number of competitive candidates and the low threshold for election. Bret Schundler won with less than 18 percent of the vote to become the first Republican mayor of Jersey City since 1917 and the first elected since 1905.

== Background ==
Gerald McCann, who had been elected to two nonconsecutive terms as mayor of Jersey City in 1981 and 1989, was convicted on fifteen counts of extortion, mail fraud, bank fraud, tax evasion, making false statements to the IRS, and failure to file taxes in connection with a savings and loan association scheme. He was removed from office and barred from seeking re-election. Following McCann's removal by court order on February 7, 1992, the City Council was given thirty days to name an interim mayor but could not agree on a candidate. Marilyn Roman, the council president, was made interim mayor by default. In July, the council named Joseph Rakowski as president, replacing Roman. He pledged not to run in the special election.

At the time, Jersey City was notorious for political corruption, and the city government faced a $40 million budget deficit, rising crime, and a failing school system. Young middle-class residents fled the city for the suburbs, leaving the city with an aging population and shrinking property tax base from which to fund services.

=== Procedure ===
Under Jersey City election law at the time, candidates for a special election were required only to collect 100 signatures, and there were no runoff provisions. As a result, a large number of candidates declared for the open seat.

== Candidates ==
- Joseph J. Austin
- Michael Borseso, former city official (Democratic)
- Joseph Charles, state assemblyman (Democratic)
- William Field, Hudson County employee
- Willie Flood, Jersey City councilor (Democratic)
- Dolores R. Lemire
- Robert J. Kenny
- Allen Manzo, bus company owner and former chair of the Jersey City Democratic organization (Democratic)
- Louis Manzo, Hudson County freeholder (Democratic)
- James A. McLaughlin, funeral home owner and former chair of the Jersey City redevelopment agency (Democratic)
- Israel Mischel
- Marilyn Roman, Jersey City councilor and former interim mayor (Democratic)
- Peter Santiana
- Bret Schundler, retired investment advisor and candidate for state senate in 1991 (Republican)
- Faoud Shafik
- Frances D. Thompson, former Jersey City councilor (Democratic)
- Jim Turner
- Jaime Vazquez, Jersey City councilor (Democratic)
- Esmat Zaklama

== Campaign ==
With nineteen candidates in the race, the special election was particularly contentious. "This year the signs don't stay up as long," said investment banker Bret Schundler, "because you have 18 other people tearing them down." Generally, freeholder Louis Manzo, interim mayor Marilyn Roman, businessman James McLaughlin, and Schundler were considered the leaders in the race, given their ability to advertise on daily cable television. However, other candidates had bases of support throughout the city, particularly in racial minority communities.

Louis Manzo, a political enemy of former mayor McCann, had the backing of the Hudson County Democratic organization and was one of the first to announce his candidacy. However, he was opposed by his brother Allen, who had been a McCann ally and filed his candidacy just before the deadline. Allen Manzo won the top ballot position in a drawing by the city clerk and pledged to run an active campaign, after which Louis unsuccessfully sued to have Allen removed from the ballot and changed his slogan to "The Real Manzo". Their mother, Mary, appeared in a commercial for Louis. On election eve, Allen Manzo beat Rudolph Conty, a 66-year old man, with a tire iron. The man had been hanging Louis Manzo for Mayor signs from a telephone pole and was hospitalized with a serious head injury. Allen Manzo was arrested and charged with aggravated assault and possession of an unlawful weapon; he pled self defense.

The candidates general agreed on the need to stabilize taxes and increase neighborhood policing. Schundler distinguished himself from the field through his support for a voucher system to enable parents to send their children to private schools. Although the race was nonpartisan, Schundler was known to be a Republican following his campaign for state senate in 1991 and led a coalition opposing the recent increase in property taxes following a series of reassessments by the city.

Candidates made special efforts to appeal to the senior citizen population by campaigning at church bingo nights and at housing centers ahead of bus trips to Atlantic City.

== Results ==
Candidate	Votes	Percent
Bret Schundler	10,681	17.61%
Louis Manzo	8,914	14.69%
Marilyn Roman	7,691	12.68%
Joseph Charles	7,205	11.88%
Willie Flood	6,216	10.25%
James A. McLaughlin	6,037	9.95%
Allen Manzo	4,591	7.57%
Jaime Vazquez	3,922	6.46%
Michael Borseso	1,898	3.13%
Jim Turner	1,036	1.71%
Frances D. Thompson	555	0.91%
Fouad Shafik	417	0.69%
Dolores R. Lemire	334	0.55%
Israel Mischel	313	0.52%
Esmat Zaklama	233	0.38%
William Field	202	0.33%
Peter J. Santiana	150	0.25%
Joseph J. Austin	135	0.22%
Robert J. Kenny	132	0.22%
Other	5	
Votes	60,667	100.00%
Ballots cast	67,152	
Eligible voters	89,692	

Observers attributed Schundler's victory to the split in the black vote and the presence of Allen Manzo, who siphoned more than 3,900 votes from his brother in a race decided by fewer than 1,700.

An election to fill the unexpired city council term of Marilyn Roman, held the same day, attracted another twenty candidates. Former mayor Anthony R. Cucci won the seat.

== Aftermath ==
Despite consensus that Schundler's election as a conservative Republican in an overwhelmingly Democratic city was a fluke resulting from the large and divided field of Democratic candidates, he was re-elected to a full four-year term in May 1993 with 68 percent of the vote. His position elevated him to the status of a national political celebrity by 1994.

Schundler later ran unsuccessfully for governor of New Jersey in 2001 and 2005 before briefly serving as Commissioner of Education in the cabinet of Governor Chris Christie in 2010.
