= 1989 Jersey City mayoral election =

- June 13, 1989
Candidate	Gerald McCann	Glenn Cunningham
Party	Nonpartisan	Nonpartisan
Mayor before election
Anthony R. Cucci
Nonpartisan
Elected mayor
Gerald McCann
Nonpartisan

The 1989 Jersey City mayoral election was held on June 13, 1989. Incumbent mayor Anthony R. Cucci ran for a second term in office but finished fourth in the preliminary election and failed to advance to a runoff. In the runoff, former mayor Gerald McCann was elected to a second non-consecutive term in office by defeating council president Glenn Cunningham.

In addition to Cucci and McCann, the race featured former mayor Thomas F. X. Smith and Cunningham would later serve as mayor from 2001 until his death in 2004.

This was the most expensive local race in New Jersey history at the time, surpassing the 1986 election for Bergen County Executive.

== Background ==
During the 1980s, the powerful Hudson County political machine, which had historically been led by the mayor of Jersey City and had exercised a high degree of influence over the state Democratic Party, was considered to be on the wane.

At the same time as machine politics waned, Jersey City saw an influx of thousands of new residents from Manhattan, who lived in expensive waterfront apartments, and as well as thousands of foreign immigrants, including growing numbers of Indian-, Filipino-, and Egyptian-born residents joining the historic black and Hispanic minority population.

Entering the 1989 election, city politics were dominated by debates over property tax revaluations and the state effort to take over city schools. Cucci, as the incumbent mayor, bore public blame for both. He adopted a less confrontational approach than prior mayors and claimed to have depoliticized public schools and the police force.

== Candidates ==
- Michael Bell, lawyer and perennial candidate
- Richard Boggiono, police officer
- Anthony R. Cucci, incumbent mayor of Jersey City since 1985(Democratic)
- Glenn Cunningham, president of the Jersey City Council (Democratic)
- Thomas Fricchione, member of the Jersey City Council
- Thomas Hart, member of the Jersey City Council
- Bobby Jackson, former president of the Jersey City Council (Democratic)
- Gerald McCann, former mayor of Jersey City (1981–85) (Democratic)
- Peter Murphy, banker
- Thomas F. X. Smith, former mayor of Jersey City (1977–81) (Democratic)

== Campaign ==
The primary candidates in the race were incumbent mayor Anthony Cucci, former mayors Gerald McCann and Thomas F. X. Smith, and council president Glenn Cunningham, who sought to become the first black mayor of Jersey City. Former council president Bobby Jackson, who was McCann's business partner, also ran but was seen as a spoiler who could draw black votes away from Cunningham. McCann, who had moved to Rutherford following his 1985 defeat, separated from his wife and moved to Port Liberté to run.

Notably, none of the incumbent city council members, all but one of whom had been elected on Mayor Cucci's slate in 1985, ran on his ticket in 1989. George Aviles ran with Cunningham; Bill O'Dea and Frances Thompson ran with Smith. Jackson also fielded a slate. The long-standing personal rivalries between the past three mayors (Smith, McCann, and Cucci) also dominated a bitter campaign.

McCann, who had pushed for greater development and opposed rent control as mayor and had been unseated by a coalition of minority voters, ran on a platform calling for new housing construction, cuts in the city payroll, and reduction in crime rates. He also faced federal criminal charges for violations of voting rights during the 1985 campaign.

Smith ran a nostalgic campaign appealing to his "mostly blue collar" base of support. While his opponents adopted modern campaign tactics, Smith spoke from a rolling rostrum and used a traditional style of street campaigning.

Despite record levels of campaign spending for a local election in New Jersey, the race was considered mundane by observers. In May, Robert Janiszewski called it "the quietest election in memory." This change was attributed to the decline of the Hudson County machine and the adoption of modern campaign tactics, including the use of cable television commercials in lieu of street campaigning. As a result, the outcome was in doubt into early May.

== Results ==
Candidate	Votes	Percent
Gerald McCann	13,498	26.59%
Glenn Cunningham	9,341	18.40%
Thomas F. X. Smith	6,606	13.01%
Anthony R. Cucci (incumbent)	6,469	12.75%
Others	14,843	29.24%
Votes	50,757	100.00%

McCann and Cunningham advanced to a runoff election. Jackson, who had been expected to pull votes from Cunningham, attracted little support.

== Runoff results ==
In the runoff election, McCann defeated Cunningham by approximately six thousand votes.

Cunningham carried the downtown wards and Bergen-Lafayette, where a majority of the city's black and Hispanic voters lived, but lost in the predominantly white wards. Cunningham outperformed expectations in Greenville and Journal Square, which he credited to anti-McCann resentment among renters and minorities. Cunningham's supporters said that McCann's inroads with minority communities, which allowed him to stay within 1,100 votes in the downtown area near City Hall, were crucial to his victory.

== Aftermath ==
McCann served less than three years of his term. He was convicted on federal mail fraud charges and removed from office in 1992, necessitating a special election.

After his defeat, Cunningham was expected to return to active duty as a Jersey City police officer. He was eventually elected mayor in 2001, shortly before the September 11 attacks. He died in 2004.
