= 1985 Jersey City mayoral election =

- June 11, 1985
Candidate	Anthony R. Cucci	Gerald McCann
Party	Nonpartisan	Nonpartisan
Mayor before election
Gerald McCann
Nonpartisan
Elected mayor
Anthony R. Cucci
Nonpartisan

The 1985 Jersey City mayoral election was held on June 11, 1985. Incumbent mayor Gerald McCann ran for a second term in office but was defeated by Anthony R. Cucci.

The election centered on the effects of recent redevelopment along the Hudson River waterfront, with renters and minority communities opposing McCann's administration and backing Cucci. Many prominent Democratic Party officials supported Cucci over McCann, who had aligned himself with the Ronald Reagan administration during his time in office.

== Background ==
In 1981, Gerald McCann was elected as mayor of Jersey City, becoming the youngest mayor in the largest 100 cities in the United States at the time. One Democratic operative called the 1981 campaign "the dirtiest [in Jersey City] in thirty years."

As mayor, McCann embraced Republican president Ronald Reagan, calling himself a "Reagan Democrat" and seeking to run Jersey City as . Leveraging federal urban development grants from the Reagan administration, including the largest federal grant in United States history at $40 million (approximately $120 million in 2025), McCann stimulated economic growth along the Hudson River waterfront through the construction and redevelopment of retail, office, and apartment buildings. During his first term, at least thirty companies relocated from New York City to Jersey City, bringing at least 2,300 jobs, and McCann intentionally antagonized New York City officials in the press. New York responded by suing Jersey City over the federal grants.

McCann's personal style drew opposition, particularly following Colgate-Palmolive's decision to relocate its headquarters to Manhattan and close its large Jersey City plant in 1985. McCann celebrated the departure, saying, "We can get 15 times the taxes that we are now getting from the plant by subdividing the plant site for various office companies." He was criticized by former city councilman and 1981 opponent Anthony R. Cucci, who said that McCann's comments were disrespectful to the Colgate workers who had been left employed by the plant closure. At a political meeting, McCann and Cucci got into a fistfight over the issue. Although Cucci had been out of politics since his defeat in the 1981 mayoral campaign, McCann later admitted that he had intentionally instigated the fight to revive Cucci's career. "My allies said, 'Why don't you ignore him? The man's dead politically,'" McCann recalled. "But I wanted to bring him back to life."

== Candidates ==
- Rosemarie Aragona, housewife
- Anthony R. Cucci, former member of the Jersey City Council and candidate for mayor in 1981 (Democratic)
- William A. Massa, former member of the Jersey City Council
- Gerald McCann, incumbent mayor of Jersey City since 1981 (Democratic)

== Primary election ==
=== Campaign ===
McCann ran on his record, boasting of an economic boom and reduced corruption, which he claimed had paved the way for the major federal grants Jersey City had received.

The campaign was marked by personal attacks between the two candidates. The Cucci campaign sought to frame the election as a campaign on McCann's personal character, as well as his platform of aggressive economic restructuring and efforts to repeal the city's rent control. While Cucci admitted that Jersey City was experiencing an economic boom, he argued that McCann had abandoned blue-collar workers, who were threatened by soaring home prices and left out of the white-collar job market that McCann had attracted to the city. At a candidate debate on April 23, Cucci said that "gentrification for the privileged few" was the hallmark of the city's housing revitalization.

Although Jersey City elections are officially nonpartisan, there was an element of partisan politics in the campaign. Although McCann was the chair of the Hudson County Democratic Organization, he maintained a close relationship with the Reagan administration and had refused to endorse Democratic nominee Walter Mondale in the 1984 presidential election. James Florio, who was the Democratic nominee for governor in 1981 and remained a de facto party leader, had a personal falling out with McCann and endorsed Cucci.

=== Debates ===
1985 Jersey City mayoral primary debates and forums
No.	Date	Host	Moderator				
P Participant A Absent N Non-invitee I Invitee W Withdrawn				Aragona	Cucci	Massa	McCann
1	April 23, 1985	League of Women Voters and Jersey City State College	Gerald M. Pomper	P	P	P	P

=== Results ===
In the preliminary election, Cucci won 49.6 percent of the vote, nearly receiving a majority and avoiding a runoff with McCann. McCann received approximately 46 percent of the vote. Cucci's victory was seen as a "stunning upset," not least of all to McCann, who had expected to receive an easy victory with about 60 percent of the vote. Turnout was low, at only 51 percent of eligible voters, compared to 81 percent in recent elections.

McCann carried four of six wards, but he was badly beaten in the downtown precincts where black and Puerto Rican voters gave Cucci massive majorities.

== Runoff election ==
=== Campaign ===
The campaign intensified during the runoff election. McCann continued to alienate members of his own party, and both 1984 vice presidential nominee Geraldine Ferraro and 1985 gubernatorial nominee Peter Shapiro endorsed Cucci. Citing his growing endorsements, Cucci referred to McCann as "the man without a party."

A major test of strength during the runoff came in the June primary elections for state offices, in which McCann claimed victory. Although Shapiro won the gubernatorial nomination and endorsed Cucci soon after, McCann claimed that his candidates had won the primaries for State Assembly and most local party committee positions. "If I had lost last Tuesday, all of my workers would have left me," McCann claimed. "But they now know I still control the State Assembly, the Senate and the county freeholder board."

Cucci continued to stress the election as "a referendum on the character of McCann and his housing policies." McCann conceded that there were some abuses of the rent control system by landlords, who were permitted to raise rents following "substantial rehabilitation" of their properties, and pledged to cracked down on abuse if re-elected but also argued that tenants had taken advantage of landlords under the prior system. When a priest confronted McCann at a campaign event over the plight of the city's poor, McCann responded, "When you stop sin, Father, I'll solve all the problems of Jersey City."

=== Runoff results ===
Election Day saw numerous poll challenges by the McCann campaign, which delayed the counting of thousands of votes in the majority minority neighborhoods which had favored Cucci in the primary election. In many cases, the New Jersey State Police and attorneys were dispatched to polling places to control the situation. These challenges were so widespread that federal district judge Harold A. Ackerman granted the Cucci campaign a hearing to determine whether the results should be overturned. McCann personally defended his campaign and argued that more than one thousand fraudulent votes had been cast in the primary. McCann staffers were later federally indicted for violations of voting rights.

In the runoff election, Cucci won with approximately 57 percent of the vote. Cucci's city council slate also swept all nine seats. The Cucci campaign dropped its challenge to the results after his victory.

== Aftermath ==
Cucci served one term as mayor before his defeat in 1989, when McCann was returned to office over Glenn Cunningham.

After the election, McCann moved to Rutherford with his family.

The federal charges against the McCann campaign served as the basis for a landmark voting rights case, Vargas v. Calabrese.
