= Senator Dugan =

Senator Dugan may refer to:

- James P. Dugan (1929–2021), New Jersey State Senate
- Mike Dugan (Georgia politician) (born 1963), Georgia State Senate
