= Anthony Amoroso =

Italian-American chef

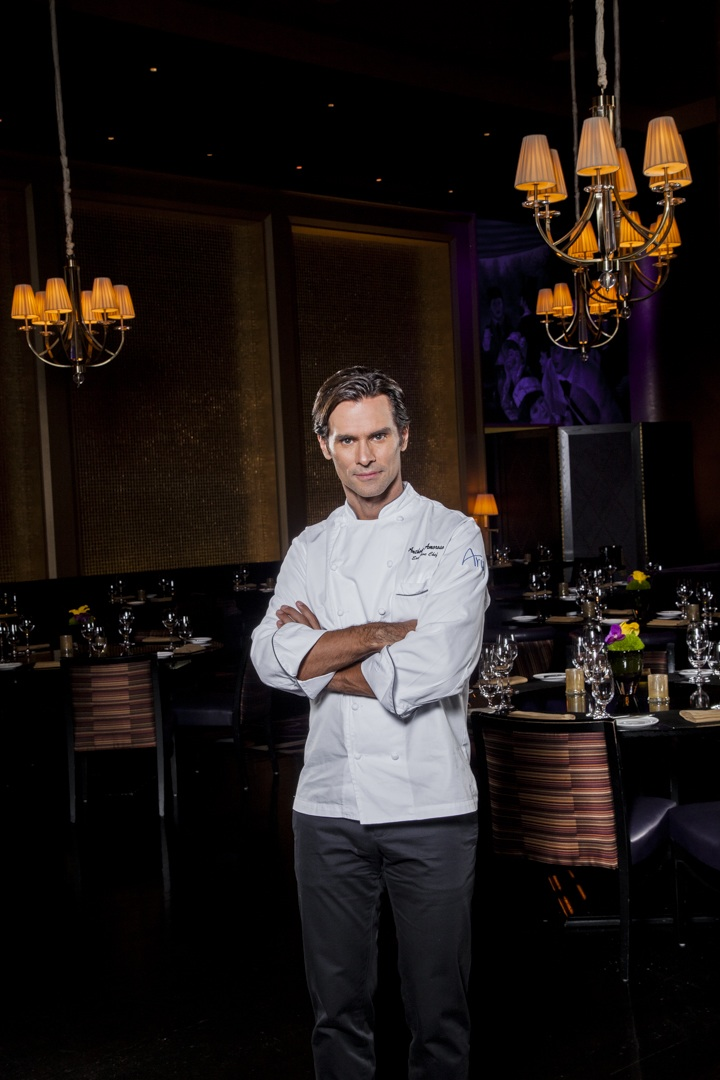
Chef Anthony Amoroso

Anthony Amoroso is an Italian-American chef who is a Corporate Executive Chef at BRGuest Hospitality formerly Executive Chef at SeaBlue at The Borgata in Atlantic City, New Jersey and was a winner on the Iron Chef America episode Battle Branzino in 2009.

== Early life and education ==
Amoroso grew up in an Italian-American family in Jersey City, New Jersey. When he was 18 years old, Amoroso told his mother that he wanted to attend cooking school. Consequently, he graduated at the Culinary Arts Institute at Hudson County Community College.

== Career ==
After graduating, Amoroso began his culinary career at the Hilton at Short Hills. Amoroso moved to New York City and began working under Chef Rick Moonen as a sous chef and then advanced to chef de cuisine at Oceana. He continued working under Moonen at Branzini, and was named Executive Chef to open RM Seafood.

In 2003, Amoroso relocated to Las Vegas, Nevada after being hired by Chef Michael White to be the opening Executive Chef at Fiamma Trattoria and Bar at the MGM Grand Las Vegas. In 2005, Amoroso moved to the Bellagio where he worked as the Executive Chef at Michael Mina's namesake restaurant, and was awarded two Michelin Stars.

In the fall of 2008, Amoroso provided several recipes for Men's Fitness magazine. While working at Michael Mina's, Amoroso participated in the Food Network show Iron Chef America where he defeated Iron Chef Masaharu Morimoto in a battle featuring branzino.

In September 2009, Amoroso returned to the east coast as Executive Chef at Mina's SeaBlue at the Borgata in Atlantic City. His Iron Chef America episode originally aired on October 18, 2009.
