= Rashawn Jackson =

American football player (born 1987)

No. 38
- Position: Fullback

Personal information
- Born: January 15, 1987 (age 39); Jersey City, New Jersey, U.S.
- Listed height: 6 ft 1 in (1.85 m)
- Listed weight: 240 lb (109 kg)

Career information
- High school: Jersey City (NJ) St. Peter's Prep
- College: Virginia
- NFL draft: 2010: undrafted

Career history
- Carolina Panthers (2010); Chicago Rush (2011)*; Oakland Raiders (2012)*
- * Offseason or practice squad member only
- Stats at Pro Football Reference

Rashawn Jackson (born January 15, 1987) is an American former football fullback. He was drafted by the Oakland Raiders then, he was signed by the Carolina Panthers as a free agent in 2010. He played college football at Virginia.

== Professional career ==
=== Carolina Panthers ===
After going undrafted in the 2010 NFL draft, Jackson signed with the Carolina Panthers on April 30, 2010. He was released on September 4, 2010, and signed to the practice squad. On December 23, 2010, he made his NFL debut against the Pittsburgh Steelers. He played in two games, starting one, for the Panthers in 2010.

He was waived on September 1, 2011.

=== Chicago Rush ===
Jackson was assigned to the Chicago Rush on November 14, 2011. He was exempted by the Rush on January 9, 2012.

=== Oakland Raiders ===
On January 9, 2012, signed to a future/reserve contract by the Oakland Raiders. He was placed on Injured Reserve on August 29, 2012 and later waived on September 5, 2012, after reaching an injury settlement. Jackson displayed game changing catching ability, sneaky quickness, and versatility to play multiple roles on his team. His retirement marked the unfortunate reality that the Fullback position was being phased out of the game.
