= Thomas Gangemi =

American politician

Thomas Gangemi, Sr.
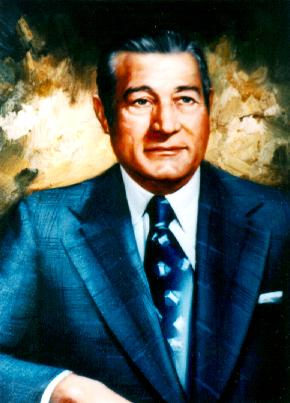

35th Mayor of Jersey City
- In office July 1, 1961 – September 25, 1963 (resigned)
- Preceded by: Charles S. Witkowski
- Succeeded by: Thomas J. Whelan

Personal details
- Born: July 29, 1903 Italy
- Died: December 1, 1976 (aged 73) Jersey City, New Jersey
- Party: Democratic
- Spouse: Carrie Gangemi (Romano)
- Children: Thomas Jr., Anthony, Marie

Thomas Gangemi, Sr. (July 29, 1903 – December 1, 1976) was the 35th mayor of Jersey City, New Jersey. Elected in 1961, the Italian-born Gangemi was forced to resign from office less than two years later when it was discovered that he had never become a United States citizen. Following his resignation, Jersey City was without a mayor for 47 days while the city council failed to reach a consensus on a successor.

== Biography ==
Gangemi was born in Calabria, Italy. He became a naturalized citizen on September 2, 1964. He filed petitions to run for mayor again in 1965, but was refused by the City Clerk and New Jersey Superior Court before being allowed on the ballot (see Gangemi v. Rosengard 207 A.2d 665 (N.J. 1965)).

Gangemi was married to Carrie Gangemi (née Romano) and had three children, Thomas Jr., Anthony, and Marie. The eldest, Thomas Jr. also ran for mayor of Jersey City in 1973, but lost to incumbent Paul T. Jordan.
