= St. Peter's Preparatory School =

Private high school in Jersey City, New Jersey, United States

Saint Peter's Preparatory School

Location
- 144 Grand Street "Grand and Warren"; Jersey City, Hudson County, New Jersey 07302; United States; 40°42′57″N 74°2′24″W

Information
- School type: Private, College-preparatory, Day
- Motto: Latin: Sub Umbra Petri ("Under the Shadow of Peter"); Latin: Ad majorem dei gloriam ("For the greater glory of God"); Men for Others
- Religious affiliations: Roman Catholic (Jesuits)
- Patron saint: Saint Peter
- Established: April 3, 1872; 154 years ago
- Founder: Jesuits
- School district: Roman Catholic Archdiocese of Newark
- CEEB code: 310645
- NCES School ID: 00862187
- President: Michael A. Gomez
- Principal: Christopher Caulfield
- Faculty: 76.3 FTEs
- Grades: 9–12
- Gender: Boys
- Enrollment: 863 (as of 2023–24)
- Student to teacher ratio: 11.3:1
- Campus type: Urban
- Colors: Maroon; Silver
- Song: "Pride and Glory" to the tune of "An Old Fashioned Garden"
- Fight song: "A Peter's Team" to the tune of "You're a Grand Old Flag"
- Athletics conference: Hudson County Interscholastic League (general); North Jersey Super Football Conference (football)
- Sports: Baseball, Basketball, Crew, Cross Country, Fencing, Football, Golf, Ice Hockey, Indoor Track & Field, Lacrosse, Soccer, Swimming, Tennis, Track & Field, Volleyball, Water Polo, Wrestling
- Mascot: The Marauder
- Team name: Marauders
- Rival: Seton Hall Preparatory School
- Accreditation: New Jersey Association of Independent Schools
- Test average: 1260 (SAT), 28 (ACT)
- Publication: Prep Magazine; Literama (literary magazine)
- Newspaper: The Petroc
- Yearbook: Petrean
- Endowment: $51 million
- School fees: $1,300 (2025–26)
- Tuition: $24,551 (2025–26)
- Website: spprep.org
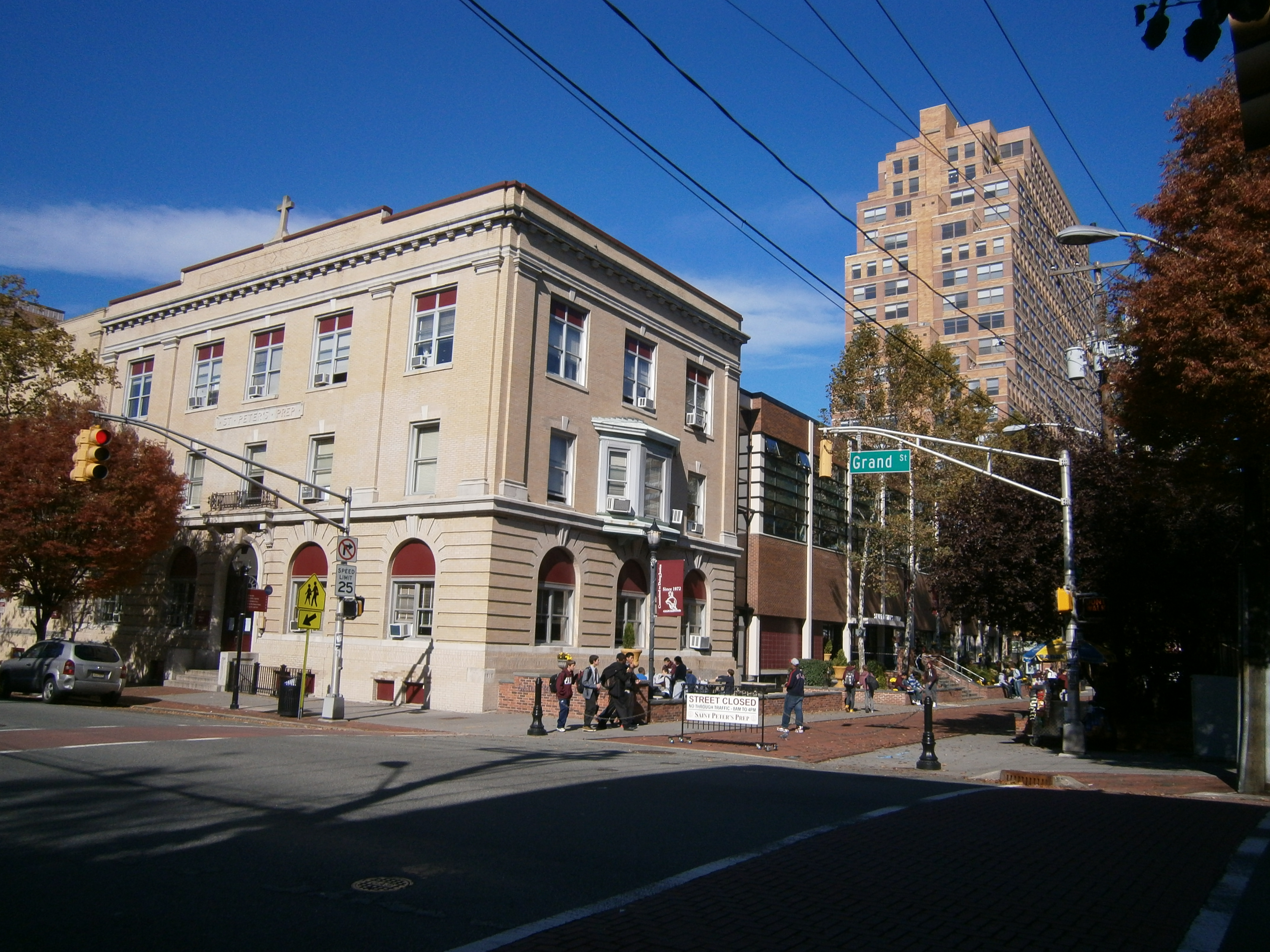
- A picture of Saint Peter's Prep taken from the side of Grand Street.

Saint Peter's Preparatory School (also known as Saint Peter's Prep or simply Prep) is an independent, preparatory, and all-male day school located in Jersey City, in Hudson County in the U.S. state of New Jersey, within the Archdiocese of Newark. Founded in 1872 by the Jesuits, it is operated as part of the Jesuit East Province. The school has been accredited by the New Jersey Association of Independent Schools.

Students enroll from counties in Central and Northern New Jersey, as well as from nearby New York City. The school has a faculty of 83 that includes two Jesuits, 71 lay teachers, and 10 counselors, seven of whom work on college placement. Tuition for the 2025–26 school year is $24,551, while mandatory fees total $1,300.

As of the 2023–24 school year, the school had an enrollment of 863 students and 76.3 classroom teachers (on an FTE basis), for a student–teacher ratio of 11.3:1. The school's student body was 45.4% (392) White, 26.3% (227) Hispanic, 11.5% (99) Asian, 9.7% (84) Black 6.6% (57) two or more races and 0.5% (4) Native Hawaiian / Pacific Islander.

== History ==
=== Origins ===
Saint Peter's Prep was established in the Paulus Hook section of Jersey City as a department within Saint Peter's College (since renamed as Saint Peter's University) by an act of the New Jersey Legislature on April 3, 1872. Along with the Preparatory department were the Collegiate and Grammar departments. As a school for young men, Saint Peter's opened in September 1878 with seventy-one students in the Preparatory department. Academic degrees were first conferred in June 1889. At this time the only building on the campus was Shalloe Hall at 144 Grand Street. Mulry Hall, on the corner of Grand and Warren Streets, was built around the turn of the century as a local social club, before being acquired by the school.

=== Separation from the college ===
In 1918 Jesuit Superiors decided to close the college division in order to focus more attention on other universities in the Northeast. It remained closed until 1930; during this time, however, the Preparatory division remained open. The college division reopened in another location in 1930 and in 1936 settled at its current location. The college and Preparatory departments were officially incorporated separately on February 10, 1955. Although Saint Peter's College has not been located at 144 Grand for over eighty years, at an entrance to the original building, Shalloe Hall, a window pane above the door still reads "Saint Peter's College."

=== Recent history ===
On June 22, 2009, the board of trustees voted unanimously to approve phase one of the Campus Master Plan.

The remaining phases of the Master Plan were to be approved by the Board once funding for the remainder of the project was secured. Prep introduced a campaign, "Imagine: The Fund for Saint Peter's Prep," for the financing of the Master Plan projects. Total gifts, as of September 29, 2010, were over $13.6 million.

Hogan Hall was renovated in summer 2017, and renovation of Mulry Hall was completed soon after.

To commemorate its sesquicentennial anniversary, a statue of Saint Peter was revealed at the start of the 2022–2023 school year during the school's annual Mass of the Holy Spirit. Designed and created by sculptor Brian Hanlon, the statue depicts a young Peter and "represents us: imperfect and imperfect-able, someone with the entire world in front of him.” The statue is situated at the intersection of York and Warren Streets.

== Athletics ==
Saint Peter's Prep Marauders Logo

The St. Peter's Prep Marauders compete in the Hudson County Interscholastic League, which is composed of public and private high schools in Hudson County, and operates under the supervision of the New Jersey State Interscholastic Athletic Association (NJSIAA). The school's teams wear maroon and white. With 1,416 students in grades 10–12, the school was classified by the NJSIAA for the 2019–20 school year as Non-Public A for most athletic competition purposes, which included schools with an enrollment of 381 to 1,454 in that grade range (equivalent to Group IV for public schools). The football team competes in the National Blue division of the North Jersey Super Football Conference, which includes 112 schools competing in 20 divisions, making it the nation's biggest football-only high school sports league. The school was classified by the NJSIAA as Non-Public Group A (equivalent to Group III/IV/V for public schools) for football for 2024–2026, which included schools with 738 to 1,404 students.

Saint Peter's offers 18 sports and 38 teams, including football, soccer, cross country, basketball, bowling, fencing, indoor track, wrestling, swimming, ice hockey, baseball, golf, volleyball, outdoor track, lacrosse, tennis, and rugby.

The boys basketball team won the Non-Public Group A state championship in 1949 (against runner-up Trenton Catholic High School in the playoff final), 1951-1953 (vs. Trenton Catholic all three years), 1954 (vs. St. Peter of New Brunswick), 1955 (vs, Trenton Catholic), 1956 (vs. St. Peter of New Brunswick) and 1959 (vs. Trenton Catholic). The program's eight state group titles are tied for seventh-most in the state and the streak of six state titles from 1951 to 1956 is the second longest. In front of a crowd of 2,000 at the Dillon Gymnasium at Princeton University, the 1956 team won its sixth consecutive Parochial A state title with a 65–48 win against New Brunswick's St. Peter in the championship game.

The boys track team won the Non-Public Group A spring / outdoor track state championship in 1952 and 1953.

The ice hockey team won the Handchen Cup in 1986. In the 2006–2007 season, they advanced to the final round after defeating Christian Brothers Academy 2–0. They played St. Augustine College Preparatory School in the NJSIAA championship, but fell 3–1.

The football team won the NJSIAA Non-Public A North state sectional championship in 1989 and in Non-Public Group IV in 1994 and 2005, 2014 and 2019. In 1994, the Saint Peter's Prep football team finished the season with an 11–0 record was ranked 6th in the nation by USA Today after upsetting top-ranked Bergen Catholic High School with a 26–24 win in the Non-Public Group IV championship game at Giants Stadium. The team won the 2005 Non-Public Group IV state championship defeating Don Bosco Prep 22–15. Saint Peters won the Non-Public Group IV championship in 2014, with a win over Paramus Catholic High School. The team won the 2019 Non-Public Group IV title at MetLife Stadium with a 21–14 win against Don Bosco Preparatory High School.

Prep has one of the most successful football organizations in New Jersey. On September 14, 2007, coach Rich Hansen surpassed coach Bill Cochrane as the all-time most-winning coach in Prep history, and was honored in a pre-game ceremony on September 28 against Bergen Catholic High School that was nationally televised on ESPNU. Coach Hansen set a record in the 2007 year, winning 70 consecutive HCIAA games.

On November 17, 2007, the Marauders beat Bergen Catholic by a score of 41–7. This victory advanced Prep to its third state sectional championship game in three years, all of which have been against Don Bosco Preparatory High School. On December 2, 2007, the Marauders played Don Bosco Prep again, and lost 42–14 in the Non-Public, Group IV sectional championship game. This was the third consecutive state championship game in which the two met, with Don Bosco winning two of three.

The wrestling team won the Non-Public A North state sectional championship in 2000 and 2001.

The Saint Peter's Prep volleyball team achieved 100 consecutive wins in Hudson County in 2006, but ended the winning streak at the county championships against Bayonne High School that same year. It has consistently been ranked among the top ten teams of the state of New Jersey. The team won the 2007 Boys Volleyball - North state sectional championship over Bayonne High School (25-17, 25–20). The team moved on to play for the NJSIAA overall state championship on June 8, 2007, against East Brunswick High School, falling 25–21, 25–22.

The Prep basketball team won the 2008 Hudson County Coviello Division Championship by defeating #2 seeded Union Hill by a score of 48–47. In the process they pulled off "upsets" against #1 seeded Bayonne, 79–76 in overtime, and #5 seeded Emerson in the 2nd round, 71–55. This marked the first time the #8 seed won the tournament.

The swimming team has won over three dozen county titles, holds the majority of Hudson County's swim records, and Prep swimmers and divers have accounted for more titles than any other team in the past 30 years. The team drew attention throughout the state in 2011 when beloved senior swimmer, B.J. Giannone, collapsed and died at a swim meet at Saint Peter's College (now Saint Peter's University). The team took on NJ #7 Scotch Plains, the school which Giannone's girlfriend swam for, only 3 days after his death. The crowd set unofficial records for attendance at a regular-season New Jersey high school dual meet. The team also wore sweatshirts printed with the number 20.67, the time that the official score board malfunctioned to in the 50 freestyle on B.J.'s last individual race on the night of his death. The saying "Live Like B.J." become popular among teammates, family, and friends, and some members of that team took to wearing bracelets with the saying. Giannone's memory was memorialized in 2013 with the creation of the annual B.J. Giannone Award for "embodying the spirit and camaraderie of B.J." Junior and team captain, Matt Jasko, who was a freshman on the team at the time of B.J.'s death, was the first to receive the honor. In 2014 the team won its 40th county title and finished ranked 8th in the state.

The Saint Peter's Prep Crew team is led by Coach Alex Canale. In 2013, the JV 4+ took first place at Stotesbury Cup Regatta, the largest high school regatta in the world. The team also won the SRAA National Championship Regatta and placed second at the Garden State championships. Along with the JV 4+, other Prep boats have succeeded in many regattas. In 2023, the Mens Sr 8+ placed 1st at the Garden State Scholastic Championships. This marked first state championship in program history. In 2024, the Saint Peter's Prep Freshman 8+ won 1st place at the SRAA Nationals in Pennsauken, NJ after previously taking gold at the Mid-Atlantic Championships.

The fencing team won the overall state championship in 2017 and 2018, and was sabre team winner in 2017. In 2017, the Saint Peter's Prep fencing team defeated Columbia High School 16–11 to win the state championship, the second Prep team to win a state championship after the football team.

The soccer team won the Hudson County Tournament championships in 1976-1978, 1992-1994, 2001, 2005, 2011-2013, 2019 (defeating Kearny High School by a score of 2-1 in the finals) and 2023 (2-1 vs. Kearny).

== Campus ministry ==
=== Christian service ===
At Prep, each year of study includes a service requirement:

- First-year – 5 hours: fulfilled through the mandatory day of service.
- Second-year – 15 hours: fulfilled through Prep-sponsored activities or direct service.
- Third-year – 60 hours: fulfilled through an immersion trip or direct service.

Seniors are not required to complete any service hours.

At the end of the second year, students may participate in a summer immersion trip, typically lasting one week. Past trips have included California, West Virginia, Camden, and the New York metropolitan area.

In the summer of 2007, the school introduced a senior service immersion experience in New Orleans. This program was continued in August 2008 as Prep sent 16 students and four faculty members to Covington, Louisiana to work with Habitat for Humanity.

The summer of 2009 saw the introduction of the school's first international service trip. Ten rising juniors and seniors, along with two faculty members, traveled to the Working Boys' Center in Quito, Ecuador. The group updated a blog with reflections and experiences throughout the trip.

=== Social justice issues ===
Starting in 1998, Prep has hosted an annual Arrupe Lecture, named after the former Superior General of the Society of Jesus Pedro Arrupe, on a social justice topic. From 1998 through 2008 this entailed a one-time lecture on such various topics as Jewish-Christian relations, the death penalty, and urban poverty. In 2009, under the direction of then-campus minister Ryan Heffernan, the program took a new direction, becoming a week-long program focused on social justice issues.

Prep also sends a delegation annually to Fort Benning, Georgia, to protest the Western Hemisphere Institute for Security Cooperation (WHINSEC, formerly the School of the Americas - SOA), which was implicated in the training of mainly Latin American military officers who later committed human rights violations in their home country, including the murder of six Jesuits in El Salvador.

== Notable alumni ==
- Nick Acocella (1943–2020), political journalist and author
- Mark Armstrong (born 2004), basketball player for the Long Island Nets
- Lawrence Babbio Jr. (class of 1962), former CEO of Verizon Wireless Corporation, now CEO of ADC Telecommunications
- Charles Beirne, S.J. (1938–2010, class of 1956), former president of Le Moyne College (2000–2007)
- George Blaney (born 1939), former player for the New York Knicks, who was Head Basketball Coach at Seton Hall and Holy Cross, and was Assistant Coach at UConn
- Philip Bosco (1930-2018), Tony Award-winning actor (Broadway and Hollywood)
- Roger Breslin (1937–2025), attorney who served as Prosecutor of Bergen County, New Jersey from 1977 to 1982
- Charles J. Catrillo (1945-2004), politician who served in the New Jersey General Assembly from the 32nd Legislative District from 1986 to 1988
- Nicholas Chiaravalloti (born 1972, class of 1990), politician who represents the 31st Legislative District in the New Jersey General Assembly
- Joe Dailey, American football coach who is the wide receivers coach for the Boston College Eagles football team
- Edward M. Daly (born 1965, class of 1983), four-star general in the United States Army who serves as the 20th commanding general of the U.S. Army Materiel Command
- Myles Davis (born 1993), former college basketball player who played guard for the Xavier Musketeers men's basketball team
- Jerry DeFuccio (1925–2001, class of 1943), editor of Mad magazine
- James P. Dugan (1929–2021), former member of the New Jersey Senate who served as chairman of the New Jersey Democratic State Committee
- Will Durant (1885–1981), author of The Story of Civilization and The Story of Philosophy
- Minkah Fitzpatrick (born 1996; class of 2015), football defensive back for the Alabama Crimson Tide and current defensive back for the Miami Dolphins
- Thomas Fleming (1927-2017, class of 1945), military historian and historical novelist
- John Walter Flesey (born 1942), Auxiliary Bishop of the Archdiocese of Newark
- Najee Glass (born 1994; class of 2012), sprinter
- Kai Gray (born 1997), professional gridiron football defensive back who has played for the Edmonton Elks of the Canadian Football League
- Jim Hannan (1940–2024), former major league baseball pitcher
- Edward J. Hart (1893–1961; class of 1909), politician who represented New Jersey's 14th congressional district in the United States House of Representatives from 1935 to 1955
- Greg Herenda (born 1961; class of 1979), former head coach of the Fairleigh Dickinson Knights men's basketball team
- Will Hill (born 1990; class of 2008), NFL safety who played for the New York Giants and Baltimore Ravens
- Jon Hilliman (born 1995; class of 2014), running back who played for the New York Giants
- Bob Hurley (born 1947; class of 1965), former head basketball coach at St. Anthony High School and 2010 Naismith Memorial Basketball Hall of Fame inductee
- Edward H. Hynes (born 1946), politician who served two terms in the New Jersey General Assembly
- Rashawn Jackson (born 1987, class of 2005), professional football player for the Carolina Panthers and Oakland Raiders
- Ken Jennings (born 1947), actor
- John V. Kelly (1926–2009), politician who served in the New Jersey General Assembly
- George A. Krol (born 1956), former United States Ambassador to Belarus and current United States Ambassador to Kazakhstan
- Donald Landry (class of 1972), scientist who is Chair of the Department of Medicine at Columbia University and Physician-in-Chief at NewYork-Presbyterian Hospital / Columbia University Irving Medical Center
- Nathan Lane (born 1956, class of 1974), actor
- Ed Martin (born 1970), politician who served as chair of the Missouri Republican Party and who served briefly as the interim United States Attorney for the District of Columbia
- Dennis McCort (born 1941), literary scholar, translator and novelist
- Paolo Montalban (born 1973), actor and singer best known for his performance in the 1997 Disney television film, Rodgers & Hammerstein's Cinderella as Prince Christopher
- Mickey Murtagh (1904-1993), professional American football player who played offensive lineman for seven seasons for the New York Giants
- Jack Nies (born 1937), former NBA referee
- Michael Noriega (born 1978, class of 1995), associate justice of the Supreme Court of New Jersey since 2023
- RJ Oben (born 2001), football defensive end for the Kansas City Chiefs of the National Football League
- Liam O'Brien (born 1976; class of 1994), voice actor
- Edward T. O'Connor Jr. (born 1942), politician who served in the New Jersey Senate from 1982 to 2002, representing the 31st Legislative District
- Tommy O'Keefe (1928–2015), former NBA basketball player, who later coached the Georgetown Hoyas men's basketball team
- Kyle Palmieri (born 1991), NHL right winger for the New York Islanders
- Bill Perkins (born 1969), hedge fund manager
- Nate Pierre-Louis (born 1998), professional basketball player for the Valley Suns of the NBA G League
- James Reuter (1916–2012, class of 1934), Jesuit Catholic priest who lived in the Philippines
- Ronald Roberts (born 1991), professional basketball player who played for Hapoel Jerusalem of the Israeli Premier League
- John Rowe (born 1944), former chairman and chief executive officer of Aetna
- Joseph Russoniello (born 1941), two-term U.S. Attorney for the Northern District of California and former dean of San Francisco Law School
- Rye Coalition, band founded by alumni Dave Leto, Ralph Cuseglio, and Jon Gonnelli
- Cody Simon (born 2002), American football linebacker for the Arizona Cardinals
- Thomas F. X. Smith (1928–1996), Mayor of Jersey City from 1977 to 1981
- Mark Sullivan (1911–2001), justice on the New Jersey Supreme Court from 1973 to 1981
- Dick Tarrant (born 1928), head men's basketball coach at the University of Richmond from 1981 to 1993
- Frank William Towey Jr. (1895-1979), member of the U.S. House of Representatives from 1937 to 1939
- Timothy Verdon (born 1946, class of 1964), Roman Catholic priest and art historian who specializes in Christian sacred art
- Elnardo Webster (born 1969), former NFL linebacker for the Pittsburgh Steelers
- Brandon Wimbush (born 1996, class of 2015), quarterback who played for the Notre Dame Fighting Irish football team
