= Shirley Tolentino =

American judge

Shirley A. Tolentino

New Jersey Superior Court
- In office 1984–2010
- Nominated by: Thomas Kean

Jersey City Municipal Court
- In office 1976–1984
- Nominated by: Paul T. Jordan

Personal details
- Born: 1943 Jersey City, New Jersey, U.S.
- Died: October 31, 2010
- Spouse: Dr. ErnestoTolentino

Shirley Tolentino (1943–2010) was the first black woman to serve on the New Jersey Superior Court and was the first Black woman appointed to the Jersey City Municipal Court and to serve as its presiding judge. She served as president of National Association of Women Judges.

== Background ==
Born and raised in Jersey City, New Jersey, Tolentino graduated from Henry Snyder High School. She earned a bachelor's degree in Latin from the College of St. Elizabeth (CSE) in 1965. She taught high school Latin and English before earning her J.D. degree from Seton Hall University School of Law in 1971. She received a master of laws degree in criminal justice from New York University School of Law in 1980.

== Career ==
Shirley Tolentino was the first Black woman to serve on the Superior Court and was the first Black woman appointed to the Jersey City Municipal Court and to serve as its presiding judge.

Tolentino worked as a legal editor for Prentice-Hall from 1971 to 1972 and as an adjudicator for the Veterans Administration from 1972 to 1973. She as a deputy attorney general from 1973 until 1976. In 1976, then-Mayor of Jersey City Paul T. Jordan appointed Tolentino as the first African-American woman to serve as a full-time municipal court judge in New Jersey. She was elevated to presiding judge in 1981.

Governor of New Jersey Thomas Kean nominated Tolentino to the Superior Court in January 1984. She sat in the civil, criminal and family divisions during a 26-year period.

Tolentino served on the Supreme Court Task Force on Minorities and was a member of the National Association of Women Judges, serving as president in 1996-97.

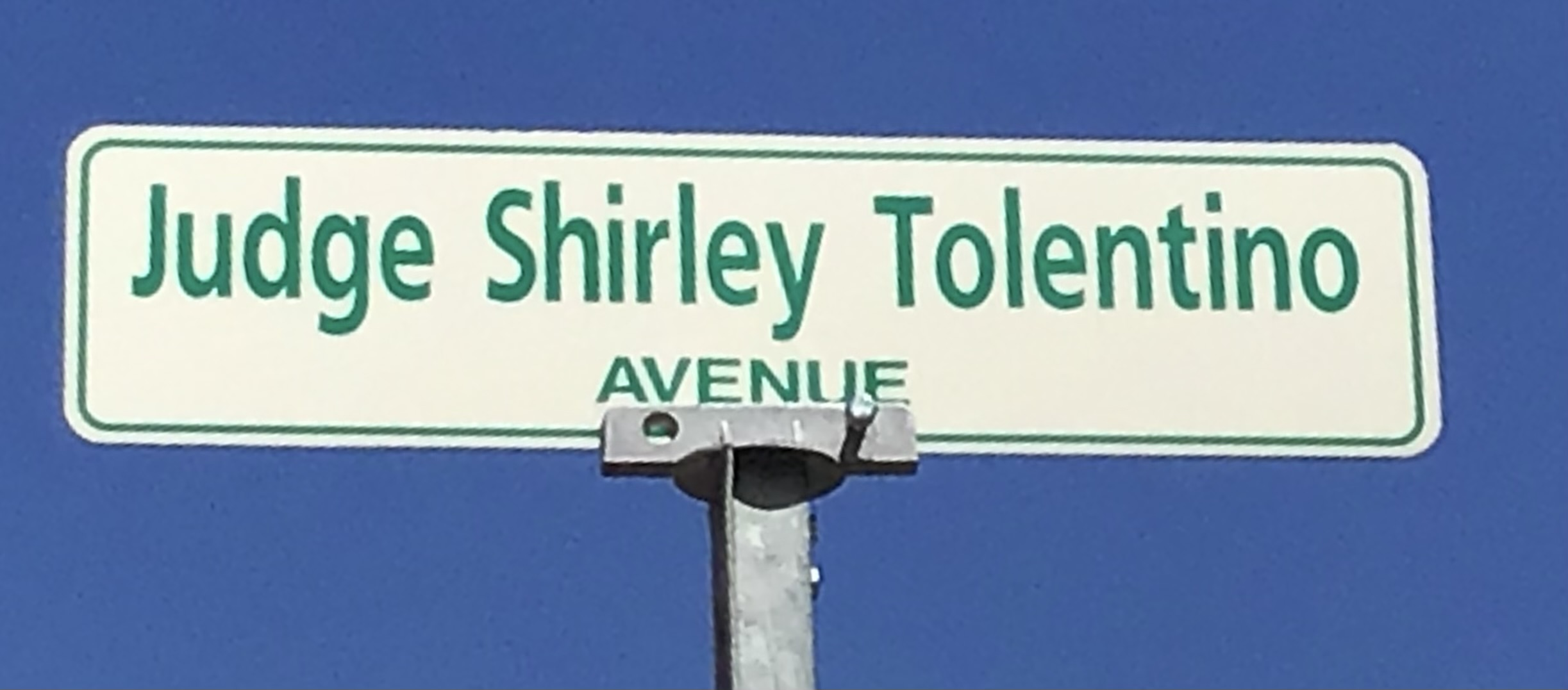
Street sign at Newark and Central avenues in Jersey City

== Awards and honors ==
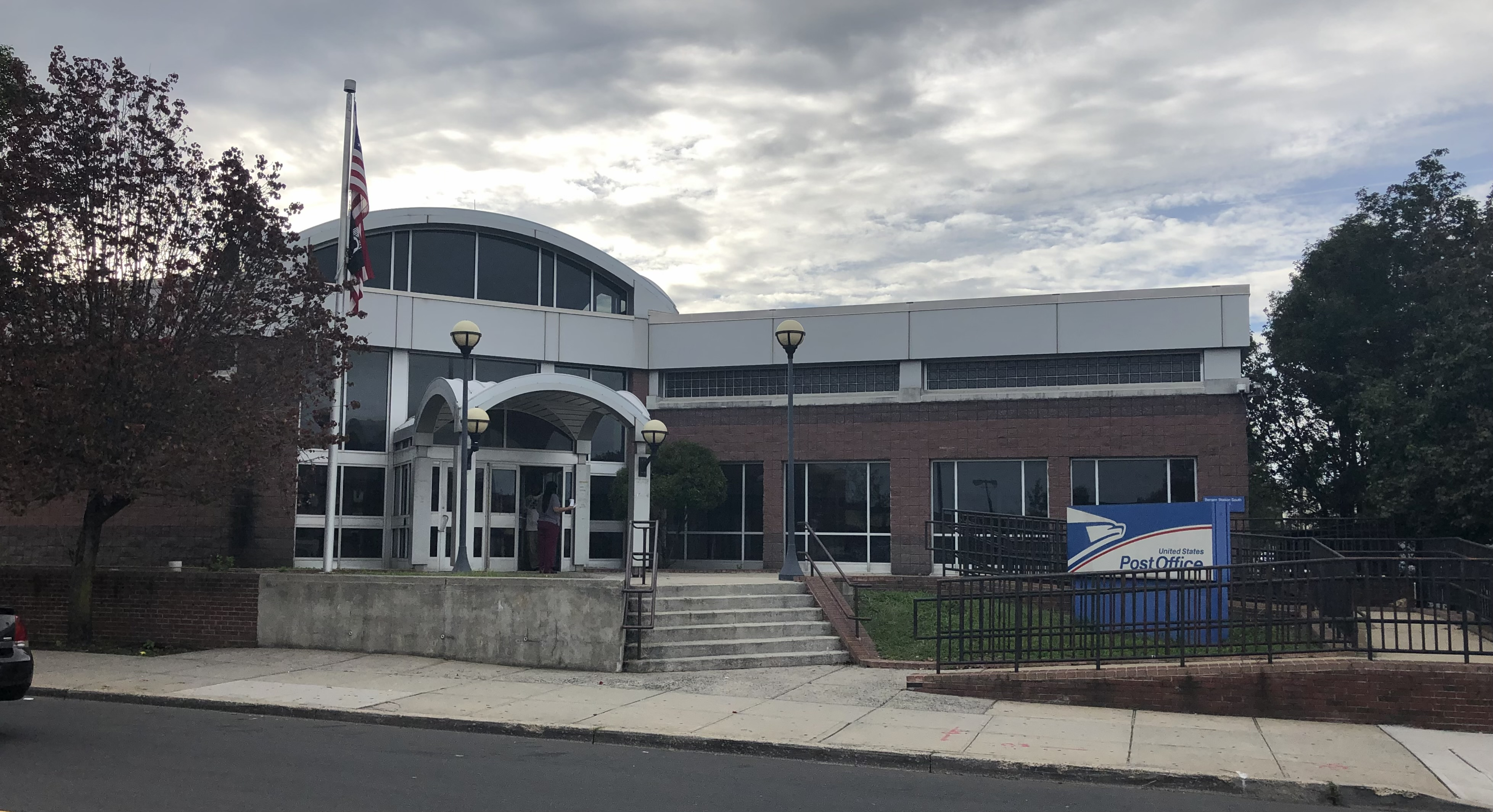
Bergen South Post Office at building name in Tolentino's honor

Tolentino received an honorary degree from College of St. Elizabeth in 1980. In 1981, she received the Whitney Young Award from the Hudson County Urban League.

The intersection where the Hudson County Administration Building is situated was named in her honor in March 2012.

In 2014, a new postal facility on MLK Drive in Jackson Hill, Jersey City was designated the Shirley A. Tolentino Post Office Building in her honor.

== See also ==
- List of African-American jurists
- List of first women lawyers and judges in New Jersey
