= Dennis McCort =

American novelist and translator

- Born: 1941 (age 84–85); Hoboken, New Jersey, USA

Academic background
- Education: St. Peter's Preparatory School (1959); Saint Peter's College (BA, 1963); Johns Hopkins University (MA, 1964; PhD, 1970)

Dennis McCort (born 1941) is an American literary scholar, translator, and novelist, known for his work on German Romanticism, Franz Kafka, and the intersections of literature, religion, and Zen Buddhism. He is professor emeritus of German at Syracuse University, where he taught for nearly four decades.

== Early life and education ==
McCort was born and raised in Hoboken, New Jersey, and graduated from St. Peter's Preparatory School in 1959. He earned his Bachelor of Arts in Modern Languages from St. Peter's College in 1963, followed by a Master of Arts (1964) and Ph.D. (1970) in German Language and Literature from Johns Hopkins University.

== Academic career ==
McCort joined the faculty of Syracuse University in 1968 as an assistant professor of German. He became associate professor in 1979 and was later promoted to full professor in 2001. He held administrative roles, including program coordinator and associate chair within the Department of Languages, Literatures and Linguistics. He retired from teaching in 2007.

His academic work focused on 19th-century German literature, especially Romanticism, as well as the literary and philosophical traditions of Franz Kafka. He also explored intersections between German literature and Eastern thought, particularly Zen Buddhism, a theme developed in his book Going Beyond the Pairs: The Coincidence of Opposites in German Romanticism, Zen, and Deconstruction (2001).

== Research and writing ==
McCort's scholarship bridges literary analysis, religious studies, and east–west comparative philosophy. His research topics have included the Zen-like qualities of Kafka's fiction, the influence of Rainer Maria Rilke and Zen on J.D. Salinger, and the representation of madness in the works of E. T. A. Hoffmann.

He is the author of several novels, including The Man Who Loved Doughnuts (2015), a comic narrative about academic life; Duncan (2019), described by the author as a "thinking man’s thriller"; and The Golden Pot (2022), a modern-day fairy tale.

In 2017, he published A Kafkaesque Memoir: Confessions from the Analytic Couch, a personal reflection on the influence of Kafka on his life and his experiences during a nine-year Jungian psychoanalysis.

His translation of Georg Trakl’s poem Verfall (Decay), retitled Rot, reflects his broader interest in German lyric poetry and its philosophical resonances.

== Selected publications ==
=== Books ===
- McCort, Dennis (September 1, 2022). The Golden Pot: A Fairy Tale for Our Time. Palm Art Press. p. 300. ISBN 978-3962581091.
- McCort, Dennis (February 26, 2019). Duncan. Gatekeeper Press. p. 430. ISBN 978-1642373714.
- McCort, Dennis (December 26, 2015), The Man Who Loved Doughnuts, University of Pittsburgh Press, pp. 3–22, ASIN B019VM2I0C
- McCort, Dennis (November 29, 2017). A Kafkaesque Memoir: Confessions from the Analytical Coach. Palm Art Press. p. 447. ISBN 9783941524996.
- McCort, Dennis (June 21, 2001). Going beyond the Pairs. State University of New York Press. doi:10.2307/jj.18254966. ISBN 978-0-7914-9041-9.
- McCort, Dennis (January 1, 1988). States of Unconsciousness in Three Tales by C.F. Meyer. Bucknell University Press. p. 135. ISBN 9780838751305.
- McCort, Dennis (1974). Perspectives on music in German fiction: The music-fiction of Wilhelm Heinrich Riehl. German studies in America. Bern, Frankfurt/M: Herbert Lang. ISBN 978-3-261-00853-4.

=== Translated books ===
- Kretschmer, Sibylle; Friedrich Wilhelm (2020). The king's love: Frederick the Great, his gentle dogs and other passions. Translated by McCort, Dennis. Berlin: Palm art Press. ISBN 978-3-96258-047-6.
- Schröder, Wolf Christian (2022). Fünf Minuten vor Erschaffung der Welt [Five Minutes before the World Was Made]. Translated by McCort, Dennis. Berlin: PalmArtPress. ISBN 978-3-96258-113-8.
- Knodt, Reinhard (March 2020). Schmerz – Philosophisch-Poetische Miniaturen [Pain / Schmerz – Poetical Philosophical Miniatures]. Translated by McCort, Dennis. Palm Art Press. p. 200. ISBN 978-3-96258-052-0.
- Merkel, Inge; McCort, Dennis; Schneider, Gerd K. (2016). Off the tracks. Studies in Austrian literature, culture, and thought translation series. Riverside, California: Ariadne Press. ISBN 978-1-57241-201-9.
- Traska, Georg; Lind, Christoph; McCort, Dennis (2013). Hermann Leopoldi: the life of a Viennese piano humorist. Studies in Austrian literature, culture and thought. Biography series. Riverside, Calif: Ariadne Press. ISBN 978-1-57241-185-2.
- Schneider, Gerd K. (June 15, 2016). Things Could've Been a Lot Worse: The Experiences of a German-American Bellybutton Jew of Berlin Origins. Translated by McCort, Dennis. Hadassa Word Press. p. 256. ISBN 978-3639794816.
- Mitterer, Felix; Martin, Victoria; Lyons, Mike; Drysdale, Patrick; McCord, Dennis (2011). In the lions' den, and The panther. Studies in Austrian literature, culture and thought. Translation series. Riverside, Calif: Ariadne Press. ISBN 978-1-57241-180-7.

=== Edited journal issue ===
- Mccort, Dennis (2002). "Kafka and the East Introduction". Symposium: A Quarterly Journal in Modern Literatures. 55 (4): 187–189. doi:10.1080/00397700209598541. ISSN 0039-7709.

=== Selected journal articles and chapters ===
- Mitterer, Felix; Martin, Victoria; Lyons, Mike; Drysdale, Patrick; McCord, Dennis (2011). In the lions' den, and The panther. Studies in Austrian literature, culture and thought. Translation series. Riverside, Calif: Ariadne Press. ISBN 978-1-57241-180-7.
- McCort, Dennis (2005). "Jena Romanticism and Zen". Discourse. 27 (1): 98–118. doi:10.1353/dis.2006.0008. ISSN 1536-1810.
- Mccort, Dennis (2002). "Kafka and the East: the Case for Spiritual Affinity". Symposium: A Quarterly Journal in Modern Literatures. 55 (4): 199–212. doi:10.1080/00397700209598543. ISSN 0039-7709.
- Cort, Dennis Mc (1978). "Historical consciousness versus action in C. F. Meyer's Das Amulett". Symposium: A Quarterly Journal in Modern Literatures. 32 (2): 114–132. doi:10.1080/00397709.1978.10733372. ISSN 0039-7709.
