= Paul T. Jordan =

American physician

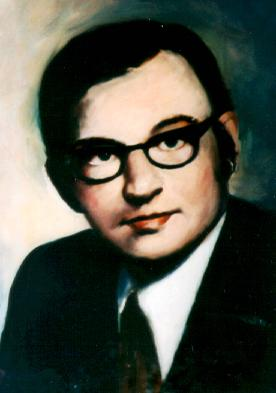

37th Mayor of Jersey City
- In office November 9, 1971 – June 30, 1977
- Preceded by: Charles K. Krieger
- Succeeded by: Thomas F. X. Smith

Personal details
- Born: c. 1941
- Party: Democratic
- Profession: Physician

Paul T. Jordan (born c. 1941) is an American physician and Democratic Party politician who served as the 37th Mayor of Jersey City, New Jersey. He succeeded interim mayor Charles K. Krieger. Being 30 years old at the time of his election, Jordan is the youngest mayor in the history of Jersey City.

== Biography ==
After graduating from medical school in 1968, Jordan ran a drug rehabilitation center in Jersey City. His political involvement began when he joined a local reform group called the Community Action Council. Jordan was first elected as a reform candidate in a special election following the resignation of Thomas J. Whelan after Whelan's conviction for extortion and conspiracy. Jordan's election was hailed as an end to machine control of Jersey City politics, and was credited to support from a large number of young voters. He was re-elected to a full four-year term in 1973. His council team included Lois Shaw, the first woman elected to the council in Jersey City. Lois Shaw dismantled an archaic law that made it illegal for women to work in or be served in bars. With the help of her all female “caucus”, they did away with this law and ceremoniously “liberated” the Majestic Tavern bar, once across the street from City Hall.

Jordan was the first mayor to propose a major redevelopment of the Jersey City waterfront. During his term, Jordan appointed Shirley Tolentino as the first African-American woman to serve as a full-time municipal court judge in New Jersey.

In 1977, Jordan did not run for reelection in Jersey City's non-partisan May election. He supports Bill Makey. Jordan ran for the Democratic nomination for Governor of New Jersey, with the primary held in June. Jordan used an aggressive television advertising campaign that was estimated to cost up to $200,000.

After Bill Mackey lost the mayoral election, he withdrew from the gubernatorial primary and supported incumbent Governor Brendan Byrne. Jordan's campaign later received a $30,000 campaign contribution from Byrne's campaign, allowing him to retire 25% of his campaign debt. Jordan retired from politics and returned to his medical career following his withdrawal from the primary. He later served as the Chairman of Emergency Medicine at Trinitas Hospital in Elizabeth, New Jersey.

Jordan served as a member of the New Jersey State Board of Human Services and served as its chairman from 1991 until 1996. He is also the treasurer of the State Board of Medical Examiners.
