= Mickey Murtagh =

American football player (1904–1993)

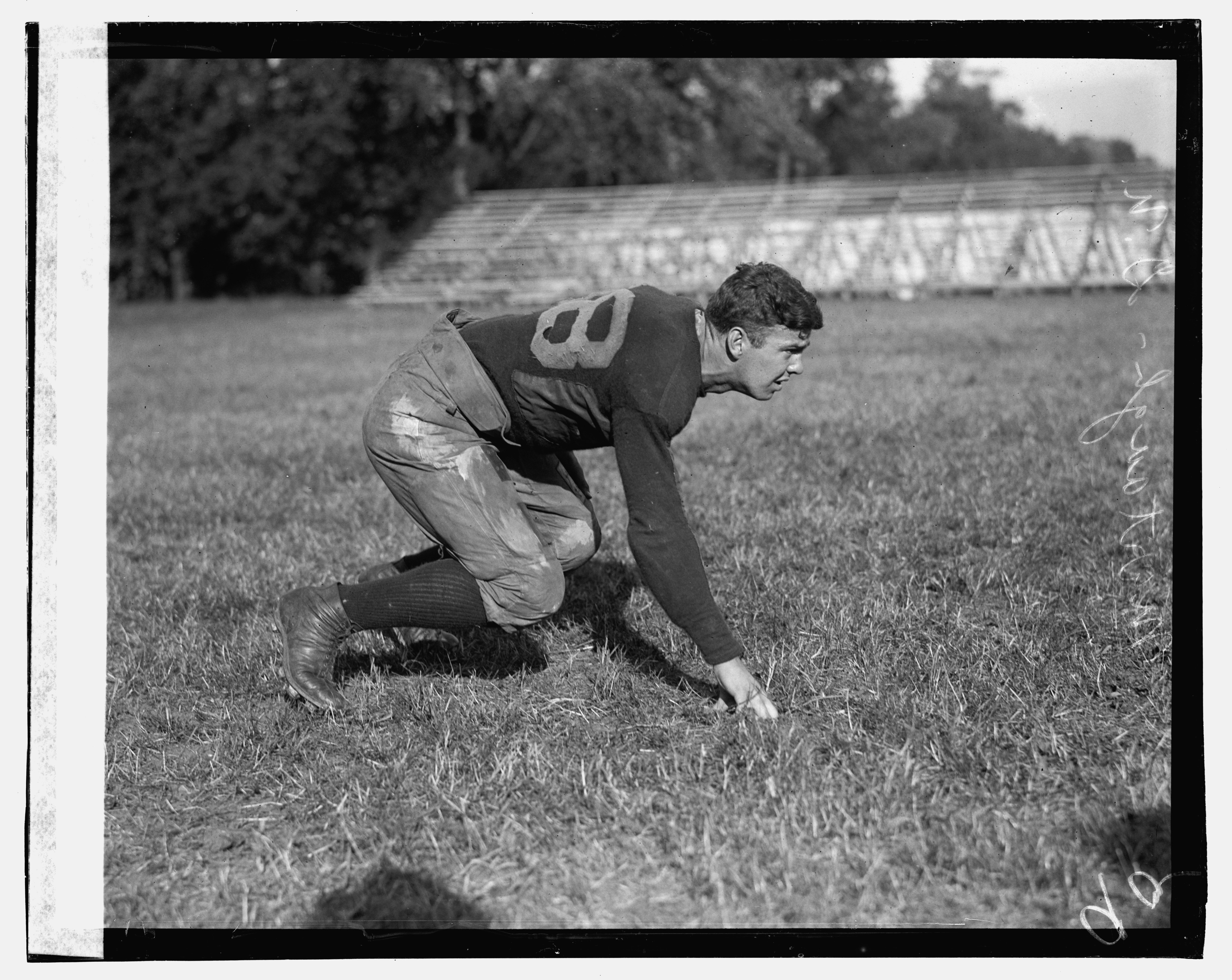

Profile
- Position: Offensive lineman

Personal information
- Born: April 8, 1904; Jersey City, New Jersey, U.S.
- Died: February 10, 1993 (aged 88); Richmond, Virginia, U.S.
- Listed height: 6 ft 1 in (1.85 m)
- Listed weight: 189 lb (86 kg)

Career information
- High school: Jersey City (NJ) St. Peter's
- College: Georgetown

Career history
- New York Giants (1926–1932)
- Stats at Pro Football Reference

George Augustus "Mickey" Murtagh (April 8, 1904 – February 10, 1993) was an American professional football player who was an offensive lineman for seven seasons for the New York Giants.
