= Charles K. Krieger =

American politician

Interim Mayor of Jersey City
- In office August 5, 1971 – November 8, 1971
- Preceded by: Thomas J. Whelan
- Succeeded by: Paul T. Jordan

Personal details
- Born: April 5, 1914 Vienna, Austria
- Died: June 17, 1982 (aged 68) Jersey City, New Jersey
- Party: Democratic

Charles Kiva Krieger (April 5, 1914 – June 17, 1982) was an interim mayor of Jersey City, New Jersey. He served as mayor for three months in 1971.

Krieger emigrated to the United States to flee from Nazi persecution in his native Austria.

At the time of his death, Krieger had just beaten William H. Link for the Republican nomination for the United States House of Representatives. He had changed his party affiliation in April 1981.
