= Hudson County Community College =

Public college in Hudson County, New Jersey, US

- Type: Public community college
- Established: 1974
- President: Christopher Reber
- Undergraduates: 9,414
- Location: Hudson County, New Jersey, USA; 40.73069°N 74.06289°W
- Campus: Urban
- Website: www.hccc.edu

Hudson County Community College (HCCC) is a public community college in Hudson County, New Jersey. The school's primary campus is in the Journal Square neighborhood of Jersey City, while the secondary campus is located in Union City.

== Locations ==
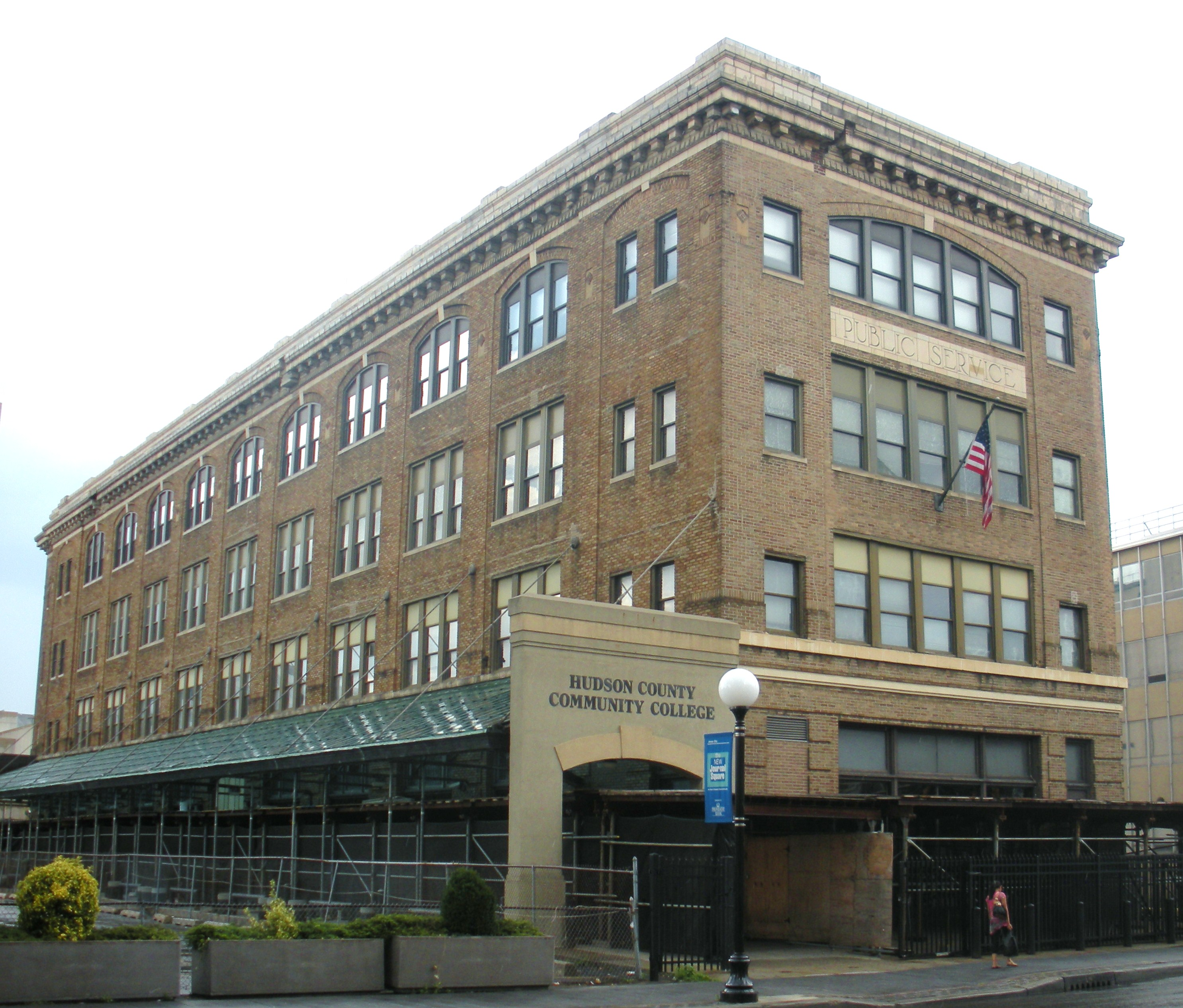
25 Journal Square, known as Pathside, is a former HCCC building slated to become Jersey City Museum

The primary campus in Journal Square consists of several buildings located throughout the neighborhood. It is accessible via the PATH rapid-transit railroad system and bus service at the Journal Square Transportation Center. As of 2025, the campus consists of ten buildings. Additionally, the campus has a parking stacker lot at 119 Newkirk Street on the site of a former classroom building. Currently, the Center for Student Success is under construction at 2 Enos Place, which will replace Building A.

Building	Name	Address	Primary Usage
A	70 Sip Avenue (Note: To be demolished)		Student Services
C/D	162-168 Sip Avenue		Bookstore, Classrooms
E	Culinary Conference Center	161 Newkirk Street	Culinary Arts
F	870 Bergen Avenue		Health Sciences
G	Student Center	81 Sip Avenue	Student Center
J	2 Enos Place		Classrooms
L	Gabert Library	71 Sip Avenue	Library, Classrooms, Offices
S	STEM Building	263 Academy Street	STEM-related classrooms
X	26 Journal Square		Administrative

The North Hudson Campus consists of one seven-story building in Union City. The building, Building N, is located at 4800 JFK Boulevard. Each floor consists of different uses, including a bookstore, offices, student services, a library, classrooms, labs, and some administrative functions. The building is located next to, and connected via a skybridge to the Bergenline Avenue station at Kennedy Boulevard and 48th Street in Union City.

Additionally, there are various off-site locations spread throughout the New York metropolitan area for nursing and radiography, including Bayonne, Jersey City, Hoboken, Kearny, Newark, Staten Island, and Summit. Additionally, HCCC offers off-campus classes in Bayonne High School, Kearny High School, and Union City High School.

HCCC has a partnership with Hudson County Schools of Technology for the Secaucus Center, a vocational school located at 1 High Tech Way in Secaucus located near Secaucus Junction, where Early College classes are offered to high schoolers and general public classes are offered in the evenings.

== History ==
Under grants from the Exxon Educational Foundation and Fund for the Improvement of Postsecondary Education, feasibility studies were conducted by each group in 1972 and 1973, respectively. The results from a comprehensive feasibility study by the New Jersey Department of Higher Education coordinated by Gregory M.Scott, then asst. director of community colleges showed that there was a need for a community college in Hudson County. Around the same time, the Community Action Program, headed by Nicholas Mastorelli and Ramon Bonachea, in a study funded by the department of higher education echoed the need for a higher education center in the North Hudson area. This led to the establishment of the Hudson Higher Education Consortium, headed by Joseph O'Neill, included three Hudson County based post-secondary institutions: Saint Peter's College in Jersey City, Stevens Institute of Technology in Hoboken and New Jersey City University in Jersey City.

As the result of an act passed by the New Jersey Legislature that allowed a county lacking a community college to establish a commission on community college, the school opened its doors in September 1974. This was three months after the department of higher education completed its feasibility study, and HCCC was established as the first "contract" college in New Jersey, and the second in the United States. As the third higher-education institution in Jersey City, the college began by offering educational programs that were reflective of the current job market, and the curriculum provided students with career and occupational oriented certifications and Associate degrees in Applied Science. In the spring of 1981, the college was accredited by the Commission on Higher Education of the Middle States Association of Colleges and Schools, and its official name became the Hudson County Community College.

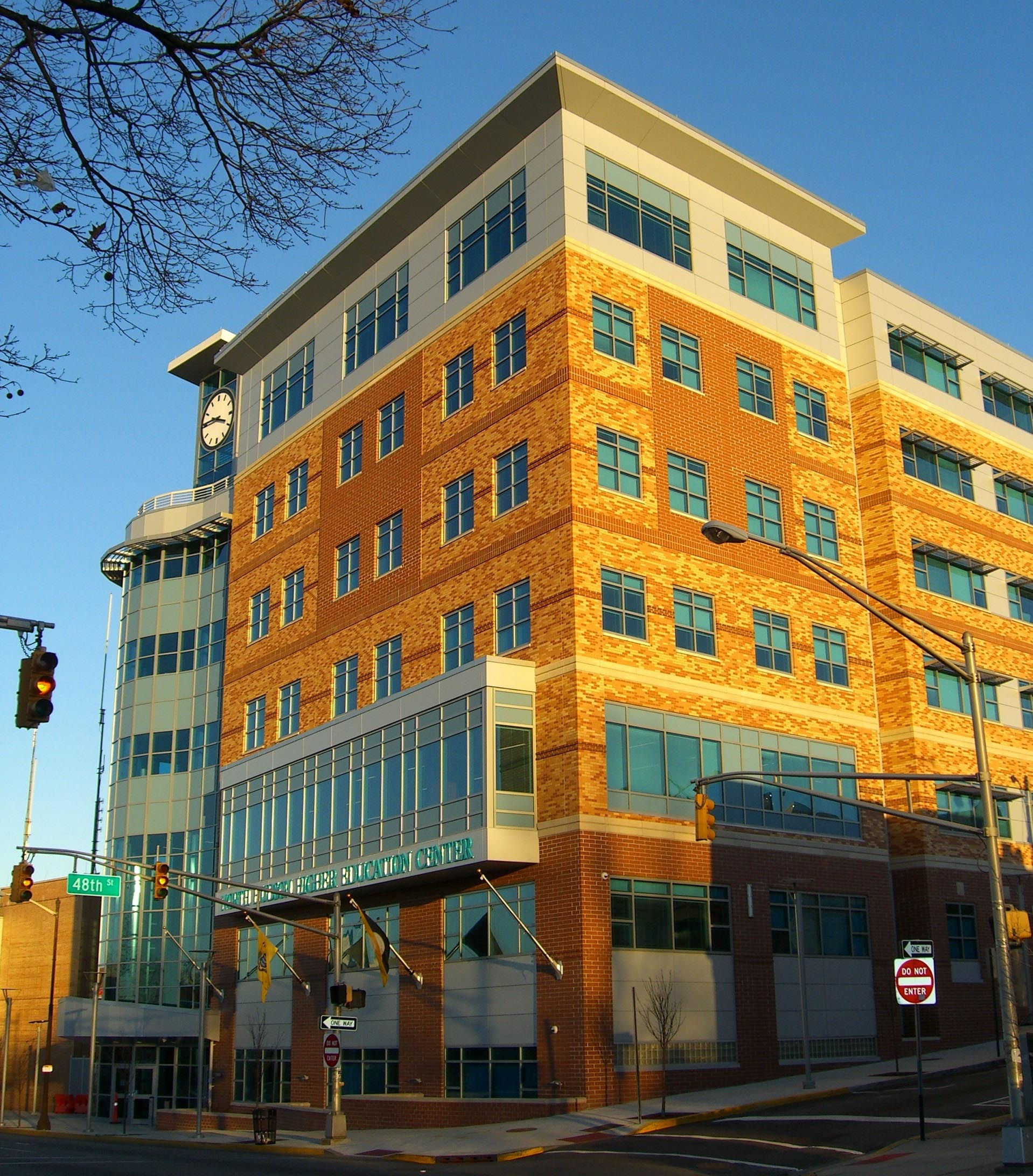
The North Hudson Center

In 1992, the county of Hudson committed to reorganize Hudson County Community College, with plans to improve services, expand enrollment and provide an urban style campus; this included a renovation to the former Public Service Building at 25 Journal Square, which was converted into classrooms and a library. A conference room was named for Mary Teresa Norton, a longtime congresswoman for Hudson County, in 1996. It was last reaccredited in 2009. Amidst changes in the economy regarding the job market in 2009–10, many New Jersey schools saw an increase in enrollment. Hudson County Community College had one of the largest in the state, at 11%. In 2011, HCCC graduated more than 1,000 students, its largest class since its founding.

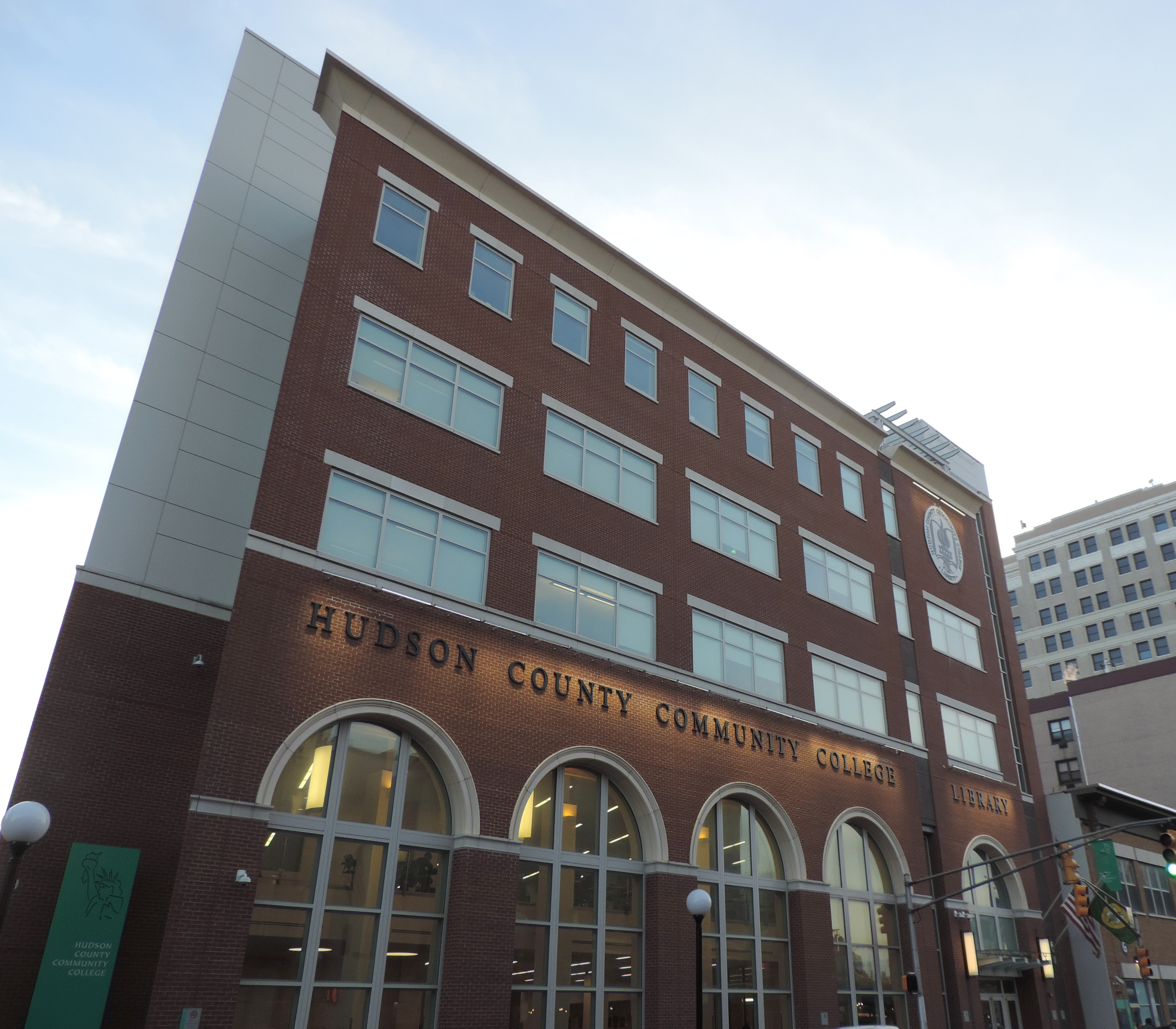
Library

In 2008, it was announced that part of HCCC's $200 million capital expansion program would be spent for the construction of The North Hudson Higher Education Center. The seven-story 92,330 square feet (8,578 m^{2}) facility which includes classrooms, offices, common areas, a Learning Resource Center and an outdoor plaza opened for the 2011 fall semester and is the first expansion of HCCC since the 2007 opening of the Culinary Arts Institute. In 2012, a new 112,000 square feet (10,400 m^{2}) multi-functional library building across from Journal Square was opened to the public. A new STEM building near Bergen Square is expected to open in fall 2017.

Most HCCC students who pursue bachelor's degrees do so at regional state universities such as New Jersey City University, Rutgers–Newark and Montclair State University. In an agreement reached in March 2012, HCCC students who attain an associate degree can continue their education at nearby private Saint Peter's College while paying tuition and fees equivalent to a state college, at considerable savings.

In May 2020, it was announced that HCCC would sell some of its Journal Square properties and build a new 10-story 'academic tower'. The sale would finance the new construction. In June 2024, the school broke ground on a new 180-foot (55 m), 11-story tower at 4 Enos Place in Jersey City, now named the Center for Student Success, which is located adjacent to an existing building owned by the school. The new building is designed to consolidate student services in the area and will include 24 classrooms, expanded spaces for student services, and centralized offices for Continuing Education and Workforce Development. Other portions of the building will feature a black box theater, a full-size NCAA regulation gymnasium and fitness center, a University Center for sister colleges, a new healthcare lab, new student common areas, and administrative offices for the college. The building was "topped off" on April 22, 2025 with a scheduled opening in Fall 2026. An existing building used by the school at 68-74 Sip Avenue will be vacated and demolished in the years following the completion of the Center for Student Success.

== Academics ==
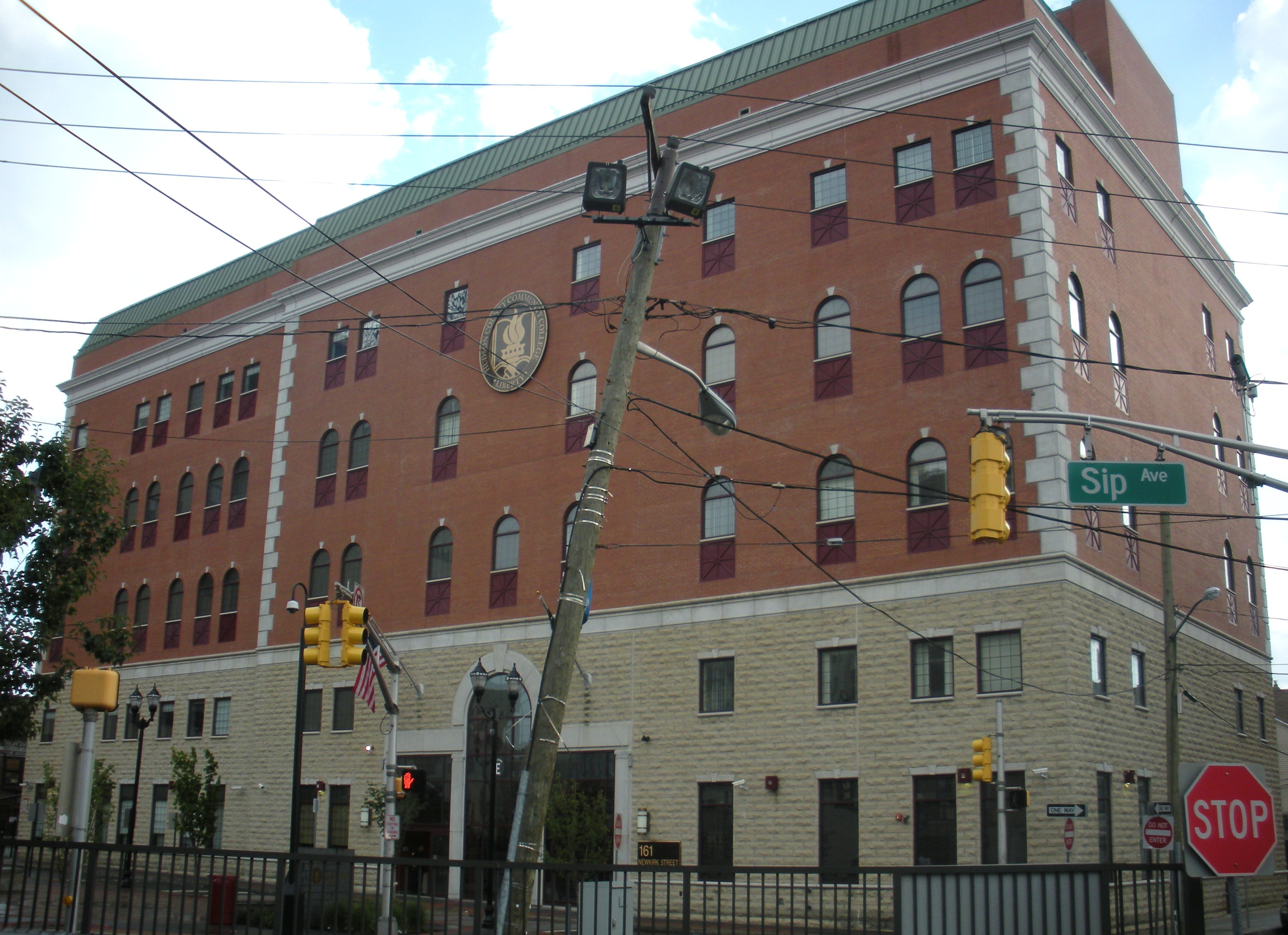
Hudson County Community College's Culinary Institute on Newkirk Street and Sip Avenue in Jersey City

The college offers degrees or certifications in Art, Business, Computer Science and Technology, Criminal Justice, Culinary Arts, Education, Electrical Engineering, Engineering Science, Human Services, Nursing, Psychology and Sociology. The Culinary Arts Institute has received national recognition. The five-story $75 million institute also houses the Culinary Conference Center. Many local businesses, organizations and governments have received specialized training in Hudson County Community College for their employees in the Center for Business and Industry. The Center for Business and Industry also has ESL classes for Spanish speakers, as well as ones for Urdu speakers, to satisfy the surrounding and attending Hispanic and Pakistani population.

The New Jersey STARS program allows the top 20% of high school graduates free two-year tuition for matriculated students while attending a community college in New Jersey. The program has extended into NJ STARS II, which provides a partial scholarship towards New Jersey four-year universities. The institution also offers a program that allows individuals that hold a bachelor's degree to fast-track becoming fully licensed teachers, without having to undergo the traditional training program for teachers.

Hudson County Community College (HCCC) is collaborating with participating New Jersey community colleges and New Jersey City University to offer New Pathways to Teaching in New Jersey. The program provides an opportunity for people who have a BS, BA, or higher degree and who did not complete a traditional teacher preparation program, to become teachers.

Phi Theta Kappa, a society for two-year colleges and academic programs, is Hudson County Community College's international honor society.

== Notable administrators and trustees ==
- Charles T. Epps, Jr., politician who served in the New Jersey General Assembly from 2006 to 2008, and as Superintendent of the Jersey City Public Schools from 2000 to 2011. He served as chairman of the board of trustees.
- Robert C. Janiszewski, former politician who served as County Executive of Hudson County from 1988 to 2001. He taught social science at the institution.
- Walter N. "Wally" Sheil, politician who served as New Jersey State Senator from 1978 to 1982. Twice served as HCCC President from 1977 to 1981 and from 1987 to 1989.
- Thomas F. X. Smith, also known as "the mouth that roared", was reformist politician, author, and mayor of Jersey City from 1977 to 1981. He was vice president of the institution.
- Silverio Vega, politician, who served in the New Jersey General Assembly from 2006 to 2008. He also served as Mayor of West New York. He served as member of the board for the School of Estimate.

== Notable alumni ==
- Anthony Amoroso, winner on Iron Chef America and executive chef at SeaBlue at the Borgata
- Sean Connors (born 1969), politician who represented the 33rd Legislative District in the New Jersey General Assembly from 2012 to 2014
- Joan M. Quigley (born 1934), politician who served in the New Jersey General Assembly from 1994 to 2012; she received an A.A. in Public Policy

== See also ==
- Next Great Baker (reality television program taped at the Culinary Arts Institute)
- New Jersey County Colleges
