= Roger Breslin =

American attorney

Roger W. Breslin Jr. (September 23, 1937 – January 16, 2025) was an American attorney who served as Prosecutor of Bergen County, New Jersey from 1977 to 1982.

== Biography ==
Breslin was born in Orange, New Jersey. His father, Roger W. Breslin Sr., was a Judge in the Appellate Division of the New Jersey Superior Court and was a member of the Breslin family, a prominent Democratic family. He attended St. Peter's Preparatory School in Jersey City, New Jersey, graduating in 1955, before attending the University of Notre Dame becoming a member of the class of 1959. He was a lieutenant in the United States Navy Reserve from 1959 to 1961. In 1964, he graduated from Rutgers Law School.

On February 2, 1977, Breslin was appointed a deputy attorney general and acting Bergen County Prosecutor by Governor Brendan Byrne replacing Joseph C. Woodcock who resigned to run for governor. He was given 12 hours notice before taking over the job. He was sworn into the job permanently the same year in September by Theodore Trautwein. A resident of Oradell, New Jersey, he resigned the position in May 1982 to be effective in July, allowing Governor Thomas Kean to appoint a replacement (Larry McClure, who was married to Woodcock's niece, was appointed). Among the cases prosecuted under his office were the conviction of serial killer Richard Cottingham and the 1978 acquittal of Mario Jascalevich in the Dr. X killings. Following his stint as prosecutor, Breslin worked in private practice.

He died following a stroke on January 16, 2025, survived by his wife Anne, daughter, Karen Anne, and son, Roger W. Breslin III.
