= Bret Schundler =

American politician

Commissioner of the New Jersey Department of Education
- In office March 11, 2010 – August 27, 2010
- Governor: Chris Christie
- Preceded by: Lucille Davy
- Succeeded by: Christopher Cerf

42nd Mayor of Jersey City
- In office November 11, 1992 – June 30, 2001
- Preceded by: Joseph Rakowski
- Succeeded by: Glenn Cunningham

Personal details
- Born: Bret Davis Schundler; January 14, 1959 (age 67) Colonia, New Jersey, U.S.
- Party: Democratic (before 1991); Republican (1991–present)
- Spouse: Lynn
- Children: 2
- Education: Harvard University (BA)

Bret Davis Schundler (born January 14, 1959) is an American politician from New Jersey who served as the 42nd mayor of Jersey City from 1992 to 2001. He remains the last Republican to hold that office. He also unsuccessfully ran for Governor of New Jersey in 2001 and 2005.

Earlier in his life, Schundler was a Democrat, and the State Coordinator in New Jersey for Gary Hart's 1984 campaign for President. He then served as the chief operating officer of The King's College, a Christian liberal arts college in New York City. He served in the cabinet of Governor Chris Christie as New Jersey commissioner of education from January to August 2010, when he was dismissed.

== Early life ==
Schundler grew up in Woodbridge Township and Westfield, New Jersey, as the youngest of nine children. At Westfield High School, he was an All-State football player. He was recruited by Harvard University, where, to help pay for his tuition, he washed dishes, cleaned bathrooms, and worked as a security guard. He graduated with honors in 1981. Schundler's ethnic heritage is German and Barbadian.

Following his graduation from college, Schundler worked for Democratic Congressman Roy Dyson of Maryland. He later worked for Gary Hart's 1984 presidential campaign. After Hart lost the nomination race, Schundler began his career in finance in the sales department of Salomon Brothers. While he had no experience in the field, his interviewer thought that anyone who could sell Hart in western Iowa had a future in finance. In 1987, he moved to a different firm, C. J. Lawrence, which has since been absorbed into Deutsche Bank, where he did very well financially. He retired in 1990, and after traveling around the world for a year, changed his registration to Republican. He later said that he felt the Democratic Party had been taken captive by special interests.

== Mayor of Jersey City ==
His first run for elective office was an unsuccessful campaign for the New Jersey Senate in 1991, where despite the partisan nature of the election, and overwhelmingly Democratic composition of the district (only 6% of voters were registered Republicans), Schundler lost to incumbent Edward T. O'Connor, Jr. by only a 55.1% to 44.9% margin. The next year, Gerald McCann was removed as mayor of Jersey City because of a criminal conviction unrelated to his public duties, and Schundler entered the special election to finish the remaining eight months of McCann's term. He won the election with 17 percent of the vote, in a crowded field of 19 candidates. Like most major cities in New Jersey, Jersey City elections are officially nonpartisan. While Schundler never announced himself as a Republican on his campaign literature or ads, he was known to be a Republican based on his campaign for the State Senate a year earlier, and was thus considered Jersey City's first Republican mayor since 1917. Contributing to his victory was that two African American candidates split the black vote, and two siblings, Lou and Allen Manzo, also split a large number of votes.

Once in office, Schundler developed a reputation as a politician who was incorruptible, which strongly resonated in a city with a long legacy of corruption dating to the Frank Hague era in local politics. He subsequently won a full term in 1993 with 69% of the vote—the largest margin of victory since Jersey City returned to the Mayor-Council form of government in 1961, and according to some sources, in the city's entire history. He won his second full term in 1997; while coming up short of a majority in the first round, he won the run-off by a substantial margin.

During his tenure as mayor, Schundler reduced crime, lowered property taxes, increased the city's tax collection rate and property values, instituted medical savings accounts for city employees and privatized the management of the city's water utility. He also led the battle to pass New Jersey's charter school legislation. Moreover, according to a Harvard University study, during his tenure Jersey City led the 100 largest cities in the United States in job growth and poverty reduction. The redevelopment and gentrification of waterfront Jersey City opposite lower Manhattan had begun during the McCann era, but it grew markedly during Schundler's tenure because of his policies, raising the per capita income in the city.

Schundler attracted considerable national attention because he was the Republican mayor of an overwhelmingly Democratic city. During his tenure, Jersey City remained a Democratic stronghold, as it has been for over a century. Indeed, on the same night as Schundler's special election victory, Bill Clinton carried Hudson County (which includes Jersey City) by an overwhelming margin, which was enough to swing New Jersey into the Democratic column for the first time since 1964. Clinton carried Hudson County by an even larger margin in 1996. Additionally, no Republican has represented a significant portion of Jersey City in Congress in over a century, and Schundler was succeeded by a Democrat, Glenn Cunningham, in 2001. Indeed, as of 2026, no candidate known to be a Republican has come anywhere close to winning a mayoral election in Jersey City since Schundler left office.

== 2001 gubernatorial campaign ==
Toward the end of his tenure as mayor, Schundler served as chairman of the Hudson County Republican Committee, and in 2001, he ran for the Republican gubernatorial nomination, facing former Congressman Bob Franks, who was favored by the party establishment. Franks entered the race in April, two months before the primary, after Governor Donald DiFrancesco dropped out of the race because of a series of news stories regarding his alleged unethical behavior. Franks was backed by Governor DiFrancesco's political organization, which gave him the endorsement of every county Republican state committee in New Jersey, except, ironically, Schundler's very own Hudson County Republican state committee, as well as the Republican committee in Monmouth County, then led by William F. Dowd.

Schundler ran on a conservative platform, which was somewhat unusual, since most New Jersey Republicans tend to be more moderate-to-liberal by national standards. He employed a more grassroots style of campaigning, visiting many local GOP organizations, and forming close relationships with the Young Republicans and College Republicans, as well as conservative issue-based organizations, including those active in homeschooling and other educational issues. This grassroots campaign enabled him to win the nomination by a robust 14% margin.

After winning the primary, Schundler tried to reunite the party by connecting with the leaders who had endorsed Franks. This included a unity lunch with Franks, hosted by former governor Thomas Kean, and retaining State Senator Joseph M. Kyrillos as state party chairman. Kyrillos had been appointed by DiFrancesco as state party chairman just six weeks before the primary, and he had supported Franks in the primary. However, the party remained divided. The Democratic candidate that year, Woodbridge Township Mayor Jim McGreevey (the unsuccessful Democratic candidate in 1997), exploited this division by attacking Schundler as too conservative for the overall state of New Jersey. Schundler made frequent campaign appearances on the late Bob Grant's radio show to help bring voters out the polls on election day. Schundler also travelled to Israel, as part of his campaign to court Jewish voters in New Jersey, and while there, the historic September 11 attack on the World Trade Center occurred. The attack caused most air traffic in the U.S. to be shut down for weeks, leaving Schundler stranded in Israel less than one month before the election. In November, Schundler was badly defeated, gaining 42% of the vote to McGreevey's 56%. Schundler even lost Hudson County by 50,000 votes, despite his overwhelming electoral success in Jersey City.

Schundler did not run for office again until the 2005 gubernatorial campaign, but remained one of the most visible spokespeople for the more conservative wing of the Republican Party in New Jersey.

== 2005 gubernatorial campaign ==
Schundler's 2005 gubernatorial campaign focused on the issue of property taxes. He proposed a series of state constitutional amendments to control state and local spending in New Jersey, with the savings dedicated to property tax reduction statewide.

As in 2001, Schundler focused mostly on grassroots campaigning. However, he also targeted Republican county conventions to spread his message and won several county endorsements. Besides his base in Hudson County, he also won the endorsement of the Republican Party organizations in Monmouth, Hunterdon, and Somerset counties.

In the week before the primary election, Schundler's campaign was criticized for using a photograph on its website that showed Schundler apparently standing with a crowd of enthusiastic young supporters. The photograph, which appeared for only a few days on a web page advertising campaign T-shirts and mugs, had actually been taken at a Howard Dean rally in 2004, with Dean's image digitally replaced by Schundler's and with campaign signs, hats, and shirts modified as well. Schundler's campaign responded that the photograph had been prepared by the campaign's website contractor (which had also done work for the Dean campaign), and the campaign removed the picture from the website when it learned of the miscue.

Schundler narrowly lost the primary to Doug Forrester, who had been New Jersey's Republican nominee for United States Senate in 2002. Forrester's considerable wealth enabled him to outspend Schundler during the campaign by about 6-1. The results were:

- Forrester: 35%
- Schundler: 31%
- Morris County Freeholder John J. Murphy: 11%
- Bogota Mayor Steve Lonegan: 8%
- Washington Township Councilman Bob Schroeder: 6%
- Assemblyman Paul DiGaetano: 6%
- Former Bergen County Freeholder Todd Caliguire: 3%

Schundler carried Union, Hudson, Hunterdon and Somerset counties. He had the county line in Somerset and Hudson, and shared it with Forrester in Hunterdon. Forrester held the county line in Union County, which was the only county where he had the line, but still lost in the primary.

== 2009 Jersey City mayoral campaign ==
On August 14, 2008 Schundler confirmed, in a news interview, his intent to run again for the office of Mayor of Jersey City in the 2009 election. Schundler stated that his formal announcement would happen after the 2008 presidential election. He would have faced Mayor Jerramiah Healy, former Assemblyman Louis Manzo (who he had already defeated, in part, in the special election in relatively early 1993), and community activist Dan Levin for the mayor's office. State Sen. Sandra Bolden Cunningham, the widow of Schundler's successor as mayor, was also considering a race for the mayoralty. Councilman Steven Fulop announced that he would not run for mayor in 2009. On January 12, 2009, Bret Schundler dropped his bid for mayor, citing financial difficulties due in large part to the ongoing financial crash on Wall Street.

== Commissioner of Education ==
On January 13, 2010, Governor-Elect Chris Christie announced that Schundler was his nominee to serve as New Jersey Commissioner of Education. On March 11, the New Jersey Senate approved his nomination by a vote of 35-2. On August 27, 2010, he was dismissed by Governor Christie after an error on a $400 million Race to the Top education grant may have contributed to New Jersey narrowly missing out on the government funding.

== Other activities and family ==
Schundler was a Professor of Public Policy at The King's College, a Christian liberal arts college located in the Empire State Building. On January 20, 2009, he was named COO of the college. The King's College is accredited in New York, and by the Middle States Commission on Higher Education.

Schundler was also Managing Partner of People Power America, LLC, which licenses TeamVolunteer, an online utility that helps political campaigns and non-profit organizations coordinate phone banks. He is currently the principal of School Partners, LLC, a firm that provides consulting to charter schools. He has been a founder of three charter schools in Jersey City: Golden Door Charter School, BelovED Community Charter School, and Empowerment Academy Charter School.

Schundler and his wife, Lynn, have two children, a daughter named Shaylin, and son named Hans Otto III.

== See also ==
- American Civil Liberties Union v. Schundler (1999)

Political offices
| Preceded by Joseph Rakowski | Mayor of Jersey City; 1992–2001 | Succeeded by Glenn Cunningham |
Party political offices
| Preceded by Christine Todd Whitman | Republican nominee for Governor of New Jersey; 2001 | Succeeded by Doug Forrester |
