= Edward T. O'Connor Jr. =

American politician (born 1942)

Edward O'Connor
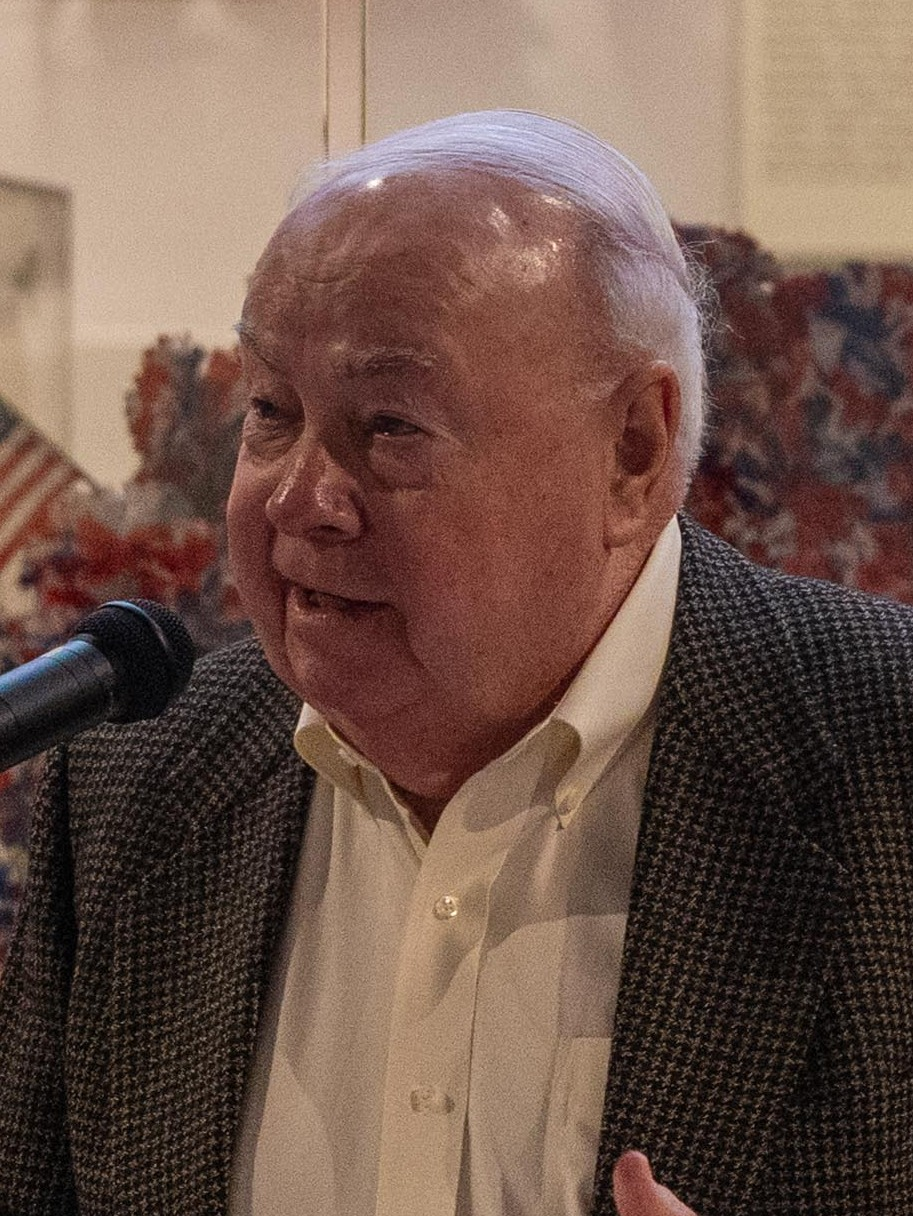
- O'Connor speaking in 2026

Member of the New Jersey Senate from the 31st district
- In office January 12, 1982 – January 8, 2002
- Preceded by: Wally Sheil
- Succeeded by: Joseph Charles

Personal details
- Born: October 6, 1942 (age 83)
- Party: Democratic
- Education: Saint Peter's University (AB); Fordham University (JD); New York University (LL.M)

Edward T. O'Connor Jr. (born October 6, 1942) is an American Democratic Party politician, who served in the New Jersey Senate from 1982 to 2002, where he represented the 31st Legislative District.

== Education ==
Born on October 6, 1941, in Jersey City, New Jersey, O'Connor attended St. Peter's Preparatory School. He earned an A.B. in Modern Languages from Saint Peter's University, followed by a J.D. from Fordham University School of Law. He then earned an L.L.M. from New York University School of Law with a specialization in Labor Law. He served in the United States Army from 1968 to 1970, attaining the rank of captain.

== Career ==
O'Connor was elected in 1981 to fill the seat vacated by fellow Democrat Wally Sheil, defeating Republican Jean C. Lane by a 75.4%-24.7% margin. He was re-elected five times, with his closest scare coming in 1991, when he defeated Republican Bret Schundler by 55.1% to 44.9%.

He served in the Senate on the Judiciary Committee and the Economic Growth, Agriculture and Tourism Committee. He served as Minority Whip starting in 1992. In December 2001, the Senate passed legislation introduced by O'Connor that would establish standards for DNA testing of prison inmates.

New Jersey Senate
Preceded by Walter N. Sheil	New Jersey State Senator; 31st Legislative District; 1982 – January 8, 2002	Succeeded by Joseph Charles
