= 2001 New Jersey gubernatorial election =

- November 6, 2001
- Turnout: 49% (▼7pp)
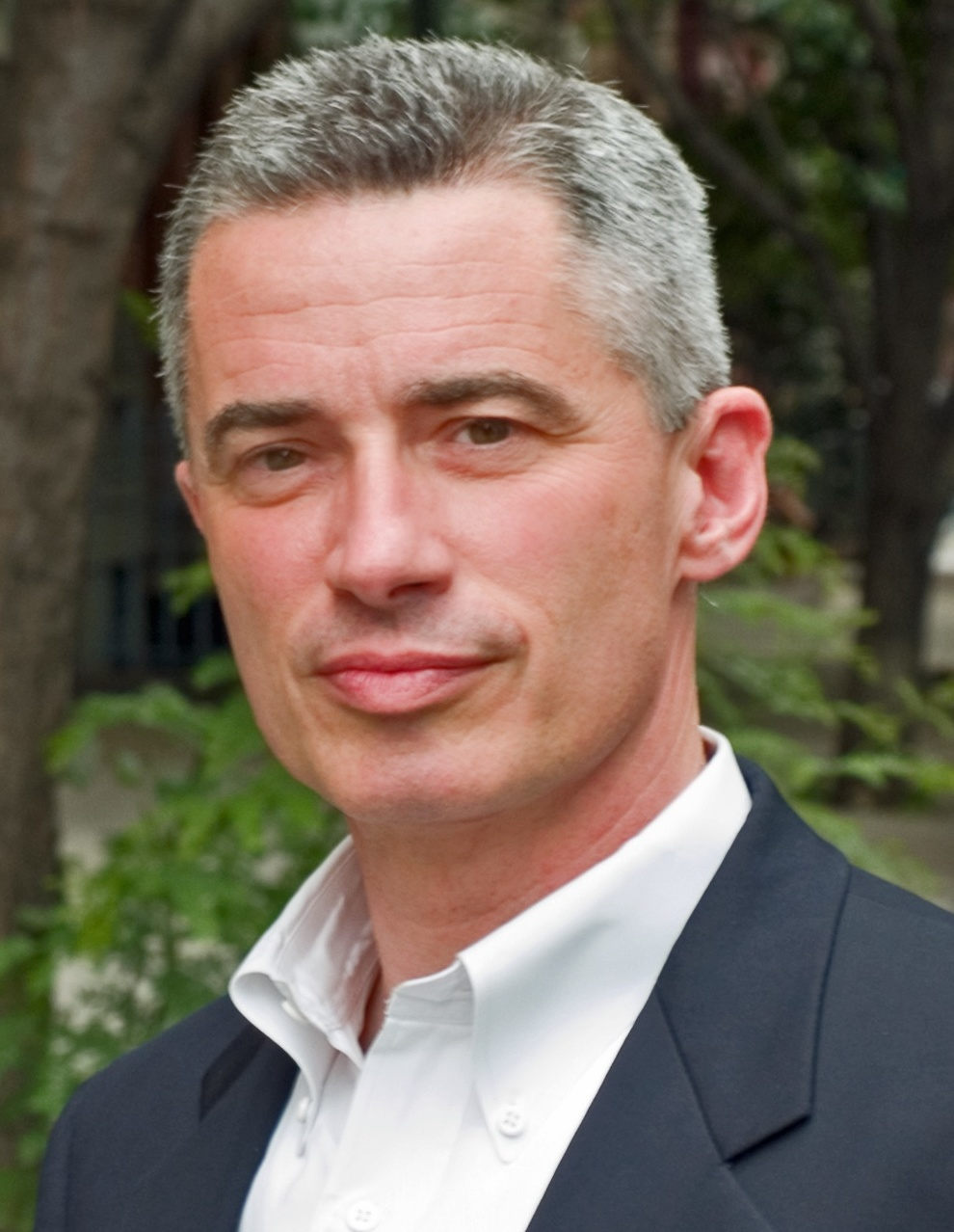

Nominee	Jim McGreevey	Bret Schundler
Party	Democratic	Republican
Popular vote	1,256,853	928,174
Percentage	56.43%	41.68%
- McGreevey: 40–50% 50–60% 60–70% 70–80% 80–90% Schundler: 40–50% 50–60% 60–70%
Governor before election
Donald DiFrancesco
Republican
Elected Governor
Jim McGreevey
Democratic

The 2001 New Jersey gubernatorial election was held on November 6, 2001. Republican incumbent Donald DiFrancesco ran for reelection to a full term but withdrew from the Republican primary. Democratic nominee Jim McGreevey won the general election with 56 percent of the vote against Republican Bret Schundler, becoming New Jersey's first majority-elected governor since James Florio in 1989.

Primary elections were held on June 25. McGreevey won the Democratic nomination for the second consecutive election after U.S. senator Robert Torricelli failed to gain party organization support and dropped out of the race in July 2000. In the Republican primary, Jersey City mayor Bret Schundler defeated former U.S. representative Bob Franks after DiFrancesco withdrew.

Democrats simultaneously ended Republican control of both houses of the legislature after 10 years. As of 2026, this is the last statewide election in which Democrats won Ocean County. This was the first time since 1973 that a Democrat won without carrying Cape May County.

McGreevey, who was sworn in on January 15, 2002, resigned in November 2004 after disclosing both his homosexuality and an alleged extramarital relationship with a man whom he had appointed as one of his advisors. He was succeeded by Senate president Richard Codey, who served the remainder of McGreevey's term until 2006.

== Democratic primary ==
=== Candidates ===
- Jim McGreevey, mayor of Woodbridge, former state senator and nominee for governor in 1997
- Elliot Greenspan, supporter of Lyndon LaRouche

==== Withdrew ====
- Robert Torricelli, U.S. senator since 1997 (withdrew July 31, 2000)

==== Declined ====
- Frank Pallone, U.S. representative from Long Branch
- Bill Pascrell, U.S. representative from Paterson

=== Campaign ===
Beginning with his loss in the 1997 campaign, Jim McGreevey actively sought support for a second consecutive nomination for governor by courting labor leaders and county party chairmen, whose endorsements were crucial to securing the county line. In late June 2000, he raised $3.2 million for the state party.

In July 2000, U.S. senator Robert Torricelli announced he would challenge McGreevey for the nomination. Torricelli put himself forward as a candidate who could bridge the gap between the northern and southern wings of the party, which remained bitterly divided after the primary election for United States Senate earlier in the year. He quickly secured the support of some labor leaders and minor endorsements in Camden, Morris, Bergen and Burlington counties, and his supporters predicted that he would receive party endorsements in populous Essex and Hudson counties as well, giving him a "stranglehold" on the nomination. However, Torricelli was dogged by ethics complaints stemming from his 1996 campaign, which had resulted in a federal investigation and guilty pleas from six contributors, and his widely publicized investments in several private equity deals. Additionally, his personal style and ambition had drawn many rivals within the state party.

With support from state senators Raymond Lesniak and John A. Lynch Jr., McGreevey was able to block Torricelli from gaining South Jersey county endorsements and lock up the support of organized labor. In late July, the state party published polling which showed that McGreevey led Torricelli among likely primary voters 35 percent to 31 percent, signaling another bitter primary fight. In response, Newark mayor Sharpe James and other Essex County leaders, including state senator Richard Codey, endorsed McGreevey. At the news conference announcing their endorsements, McGreevey swiped at Torricelli, "The Democratic Party is greater than any individual's political ambitions."

On July 31, Torricelli ended his campaign for the nomination, saying that he had been "humbled" by his failure to generate grassroots support and "naive" for believing that "people would put their own interests aside to work toward the goal of something larger." Although party chair Thomas Giblin praised his decision to back out rather than fracture the party, Torricelli declined to immediately endorse McGreevey, instead citing his colleagues Frank Pallone and Bill Pascrell as potential nominees.

=== Results ===
Democratic Primary results
Party	Candidate	Votes	%
Democratic	Jim McGreevey	250,404	95.54%
Democratic	Elliot Greenspan	11,682	4.46%
Total votes		262,086	100.00%

=== Aftermath ===
Rutgers University political science professor Cliff Zukin observed that Torricelli's decision to enter the race and abruptly withdraw damaged his standing within the state party and his ambitions for the presidency. Ultimately, Torricelli ended his political career in 2002 under the cloud of his campaign finance scandal, when he dropped out of his bid for re-election to the Senate trailing in the general election polls.

== Republican primary ==
=== Candidates ===
- Bob Franks, former U.S. representative from Summit and nominee for U.S. Senate in 2000
- Bret Schundler, mayor of Jersey City

==== Withdrew ====
- Donald DiFrancesco, president of the New Jersey Senate and acting governor (Note: In 2006, DiFrancesco was retroactively named the 51st Governor of New Jersey by an act of the legislature, but at the time of this election, his title was Acting Governor.)

==== Declined ====
- Jack Collins, speaker of the New Jersey General Assembly since 1996
- William E. Schluter, state senator from Pennington (ran as independent)

=== Polling ===
Poll source	Date(s) administered	Sample size	Margin of error	Donald DiFrancesco	Bob Franks	Bret Schundler	Other/ Undecided
Quinnipiac	November 28–December 4, 2000	372 RV	±5.1%	10%	45%	9%	37%
Quinnipiac	January 30–February 5, 2001	310 RV	±5.6%	45%	–	16%	39%
Quinnipiac	February 28–March 4, 2001	347 RV	±5.3%	46%	–	24%	29%
Quinnipiac	April 3–9, 2001	357 RV	±5.2%	39%	–	27%	34%
Quinnipiac	May 1–8, 2001	331 RV	±5.4%	–	46%	24%	30%
Quinnipiac	June 14–18, 2001	415 LV	±4.8%	–	39%	54%	8%

=== Results ===
Republican Primary results
Party	Candidate	Votes	%
Republican	Bret Schundler	193,342	57.38%
Republican	Bob Franks	143,606	42.62%
Total votes		336,948	100.00%

== General election ==
=== Candidates ===
- Jerry Coleman (Green)
- Mark Edgerton (Libertarian)
- Michael Koontz (Conservative)
- James McGreevey, former mayor of Woodbridge, state senator, and nominee for governor in 1997 (Democratic)
- Costantino Rozzo (Socialist)
- Kari Sachs (Socialist Workers)
- William E. Schluter, state senator from Pennington (Independent)
- Bret Schundler, mayor of Jersey City (Republican)

=== Polling ===
Poll source	Date(s)	Sample size	Margin of error	Bret Schundler (R)	Jim McGreevey (D)	Bill Schluter (I)	Other / undecided (Note: Calculated by taking the difference of 100% and all other candidates combined.)
Quinnipiac	October 29–November 4, 2001	505 LV	± 4.4%	39%	48%	—	13%
Monmouth University	November 2, 2001	649	—	26%	48%	—	26%
SurveyUSA	November 2, 2001	800	—	41%	55%	—	4%
Rutgers-Eagleton	October 30–November 2, 2001	746 LV	± 3.7%	36%	53%	—	11%
Fairleigh Dickinson University	October 30, 2001	600	—	35%	53%	—	12%
Quinnipiac	October 23–28, 2001	746 LV	± 3.7%	35%	52%	—	12%
CBS News/The New York Times	October 22, 2001	760	—	36%	49%	—	15%
Quinnipiac	October 10–15, 2001	742 LV	± 3.6%	39%	49%	—	12%
Quinnipiac	October 10–15, 2001	1,140 RV	± 2.9%	35%	49%	—	15%
Rutgers-Eagleton	October 13–17, 2001	449 LV	± 4.7%	33%	45%	—	22%
Rutgers-Eagleton	September 22–26, 2001	424 LV	± 4.0%	31%	46%	—	24%
Quinnipiac	September 19–24, 2001	1,406 RV	± 2.6%	30%	44%	—	27%
Rutgers-Eagleton	August 15–21, 2001	395 LV	± 5.0%	33%	54%	—	14%
Rutgers-Eagleton	August 15–21, 2001	395 LV	± 5.0%	29%	48%	4%	20%
Quinnipiac	July 29–August 5, 2001	1,235 RV	± 2.8%	30%	49%	—	21%
Quinnipiac	June 27–July 1, 2001	851 RV	± 3.4%	35%	48%	—	17%
Quinnipiac	May 1–8, 2001	1,181 RV	± 2.9%	27%	48%	—	25%
Rutgers-Eagleton	April 11–17, 2001	632 RV	± 4.0%	22%	46%	—	32%
Quinnipiac	April 3–9, 2001	1,145 RV	± 2.9%	27%	43%	—	30%
Quinnipiac	February 28–March 4, 2001	1,129 RV	± 2.9%	31%	45%	—	24%
Quinnipiac	January 30–February 5, 2001	1,156 RV	± 2.9%	22%	46%	—	36%
Rutgers-Eagleton	January 24–30, 2001	649 RV	± 4.0%	19%	43%	—	37%
Quinnipiac	November 28–December 4, 2000	1,261 RV	± 2.8%	24%	40%	—	36%

Hypothetical polling

with Donald DiFrancesco

Poll source	Date(s) administered	Sample size	Margin of error	Jim McGreevey (D)	Donald DiFrancesco (R)	Other/ Undecided
Quinnipiac	November 28–December 4, 2000	1,261 RV	± 2.8%	41%	26%	34%
Rutgers-Eagleton	January 24–30, 2001	649 LV	± 4.0%	39%	26%	35%
Quinnipiac	January 30–February 5, 2001	1,156 RV	± 2.9%	40%	32%	28%
Quinnipiac	February 28–March 4, 2001	1,129 RV	± 2.9%	41%	37%	22%
Quinnipiac	February 28–March 4, 2001	1,145 RV	± 2.9%	42%	33%	24%
Rutgers-Eagleton	April 11–17, 2001	632 LV	± 4.0%	44%	26%	30%

with Bob Franks

Poll source	Date(s) administered	Sample size	Margin of error	Jim McGreevey (D)	Bob Franks (R)	Other/ Undecided
Quinnipiac	November 28–December 4, 2000	1,261 RV	± 2.8%	38%	35%	28%
Quinnipiac	May 1–8, 2001	1,181 RV	± 2.9%	44%	35%	21%

=== Results ===
New Jersey Gubernatorial Election, 2001
Party	Candidate	Votes	%	±%
Democratic	Jim McGreevey	1,256,853	56.43%	+10.61%
Republican	Bret Schundler	928,174	41.68%	−5.19%
Independent	Bill Schluter	24,084	1.08%	N/A
Green	Jerry L. Coleman	6,238	0.28%	−0.16%
Libertarian	Mark Edgerton	4,684	0.21%	−4.51%
Independent	George Watson, Jr.	2,568	0.12%	N/A
Conservative	Michael W. Koontz	1,949	0.09%	−1.35%
Socialist	Costantino Rozzo	1,537	0.07%	−0.05%
Socialist Workers	Kari Sachs	1,078	0.05%	−0.07%
Majority		328,679	14.75%	+15.80%
Turnout		2,227,165		
Democratic gain from Republican		Swing		

==== Results by county ====
County	McGreevey votes	McGreevey %	Schundler votes	Schundler %	Other votes	Other %
Atlantic	38,623	57.5%	27,547	41.0%	995	1.5%
Bergen	140,215	55.1%	111,221	43.7%	3,106	1.2%
Burlington	62,697	55.4%	48,098	42.5%	2,437	2.2%
Camden	78,169	64.6%	40,063	33.1%	2,728	2.3%
Cape May	17,118	48.5%	17,471	49.5%	735	2.1%
Cumberland	19,445	57.7%	13,583	40.3%	668	2.0%
Essex	129,406	71.9%	48,540	27.0%	2,083	1.2%
Gloucester	41,083	58.1%	28,210	39.9%	1,392	2.0%
Hudson	85,074	68.8%	37,440	30.3%	1,224	1.0%
Hunterdon	13,911	35.3%	23,059	58.4%	2,484	6.3%
Mercer	57,513	60.9%	31,705	33.6%	5,148	5.5%
Middlesex	117,061	62.7%	66,749	35.7%	2,999	1.6%
Monmouth	91,838	49.5%	89,987	48.5%	3,647	2.0%
Morris	60,948	42.8%	79,350	55.8%	1,942	1.4%
Ocean	84,538	51.2%	77,726	47.1%	2,690	1.6%
Passaic	62,390	58.1%	43,806	40.8%	1,238	1.2%
Salem	10,837	53.5%	8,878	43.8%	540	2.7%
Somerset	39,110	45.6%	44,815	52.2%	1,903	2.2%
Sussex	14,641	37.5%	23,478	60.1%	957	2.4%
Union	79,682	60.3%	50,780	38.4%	1,790	1.4%
Warren	12,554	42.3%	15,668	52.8%	1,432	4.8%

Counties that flipped from Republican to Democratic

- Atlantic (largest municipality: Egg Harbor Township)
- Bergen (largest municipality: Hackensack)
- Monmouth (largest municipality: Middletown Township)
- Ocean (largest municipality: Lakewood)
- Salem (largest municipality: Pennsville Township)
