= Wally Sheil =

American politician

Member of the New Jersey Senate from the 31st district
- In office 1978–1982
- Preceded by: James P. Dugan
- Succeeded by: Edward T. O'Connor Jr.

Personal details
- Born: Walter N. Sheil; April 15, 1929
- Died: June 23, 2002 (aged 73) Cuddebackville, New York, U.S.
- Party: Democratic (1978–1991); Republican (1991–2002)
- Education: Seton Hall University (BS, MA)

Military service
- Branch/service: United States Army

Walter N. "Wally" Sheil (April 15, 1929 – June 23, 2002) was an American academic administrator and politician from Jersey City, New Jersey, who served in the New Jersey Senate as a Democrat from 1978 to 1982, and ran as Republican candidate for Sarasota County Commission in 1996.

== Education ==
Sheil attended Saint Peter's College in Jersey City, where he played basketball with Thomas F. X. Smith. He graduated with a Bachelor of Science in 1950. Sheil went on to play for the Carbondale Aces of the American Basketball League. Sheil received a Master of Arts from Seton Hall University in 1952.

== Career ==
Sheil worked as the director of admissions at Saint Peter's from 1957 to 1962 and director of continuing education at Jersey City State College (now New Jersey City University) from 1967 to 1977. Sheil was president of Hudson County Community College from 1977 to 1981 and from 1987 to 1989. Sheil also served in the United States Army as personnel psychologist.

While in the State Senate, Sheil was stripped of his assignments on the Judiciary Committee for supporting Republican Thomas Kean in the 1981 New Jersey gubernatorial election. He filed a lawsuit against Senate President Joseph P. Merlino for the removal.

Sheil served as the Hudson County Democratic Party chairman from 1977 to 1981. Smith attempted to remove Sheil as chairman in 1980. A split among county Democrats saw Sheil lose the 1981 primary election to Edward T. O'Connor Jr.

Sheil retired to Sarasota, Florida, in 1991, where he changed his political affiliation to Republican. Sheil ran in the Republican primary for a seat on the Sarasota County commission in 1996. He lost the primary to Ray Pilon, and later helped file an ethics complaint against Pilon for using a non-public mailing list to solicit campaign support. Pilon was the subject of a suggested fine of $100.00 by the Florida Commission on Ethics.

== Personal life ==
Sheil died on June 23, 2002, in Cuddebackville, New York, and was interred at Holy Name Catholic Cemetery in Otisville.

New Jersey Senate
Preceded by James P. Dugan	Member of the New Jersey Senate from the 31st district 1978–1982	Succeeded by Edward T. O'Connor Jr.
