= Thomas J. Whelan (mayor) =

American politician

36th Mayor of Jersey City
- In office November 13, 1963 – July 6, 1971
- Preceded by: Thomas Gangemi
- Succeeded by: Charles K. Krieger

Personal details
- Born: January 28, 1922 Jersey City, New Jersey
- Died: July 31, 2002 (aged 80) Naples, Florida
- Party: Democratic
- Spouse: Eileen Catherine Whelan
- Children: Michael, Thomas, John, Paul, Mary, Eileen

Thomas J. Whelan (January 28, 1922 – July 31, 2002) was an American politician who served as the mayor of Jersey City, New Jersey, from 1963 to 1971.

== Biography ==
Whelan was born in Jersey City on January 28, 1922 as one of thirteen children to Joseph J. and Charlotte Vogel Whelan.

Whelan flew 63 missions in World War II as a pilot in the Army Air Force. He later became the chief security officer of New Jersey Bell Telephone Co.

A Democrat, Whelan was appointed mayor in 1963 when his predecessor, Thomas Gangemi, was forced to resign when he learned that he was not a US citizen. Whelan then ran for mayor in 1965 and again in 1969, winning both times.

In 1971, during his second term, Whelan was indicted by the U.S. Attorney's Office for the District of New Jersey as a member of the Hudson County Eight, and was convicted in federal court of conspiracy and extortion in a multimillion-dollar political kickback scheme connected to city and county contracts.

Convicted along with him was former mayor and political boss, John V. Kenny and former City Council president Thomas Flaherty. Whelan served seven years of a 15-year sentence in the federal penitentiary in Lewisburg, Pennsylvania.

Whelan died on July 31, 2002, at home in Naples, Florida, aged 80.
