= Marilyn Roman =

American mayor

Acting Mayor of Jersey City
- In office February 14, 1992 – June 30, 1992
- Preceded by: Gerald McCann
- Succeeded by: Joseph Rakowski

Personal details
- Born: March 1936 (age 90)
- Party: Democratic
- Spouse: Bill Roman
- Profession: Education Administrator

Marilyn Roman (born March 1936) is an American educator and Democratic Party politician who served as Acting Mayor of Jersey City, New Jersey. As City Council President, she became Acting Mayor succeeding Gerald McCann after his removal from office. Roman was the first woman to hold the office of mayor in the history of Jersey City.

== Biography ==
Roman attended New Jersey City University earning a bachelor's degree in elementary education and a master's degree in urban education. She worked as a teacher and supervisor for the Jersey City Board of Education. Roman became involved in politics as a member of the Everett Terrace Block Association where she served as a representative attending City Council Meetings. At the urging of McCann, she was elected to the Hudson County Board of Chosen Freeholders in 1984 and served two terms. Running on McCann's ticket, Roman was elected to the city council in 1989.

Roman was director of the Education-Business Alliance of the Jersey City Board of Education and president of the City Council when McCann was removed from office following his conviction on Federal fraud charges. Roman continued to fill the vacancy when the city council failed to elect another candidate after 30 days. Roman served as mayor for four months until the city council reorganized and selected a new Council President.

Following the announced retirement of Congressman Frank J. Guarini, Roman organized and supported a slate of candidates in the 1992 Democratic Primary. She claimed to organize the ticket to support candidates for the Democratic County Committee farther down the ballot. Roman's candidates were opposed by a slate headed by State Senator Robert Menendez and supported by Hudson County Executive Robert C. Janiszewski. Menendez defeated Robert P. Haney by a ratio of 2–1, and Roman's candidates for Democratic County Committee only won one-third of the seats.

The City Council of Jersey City reorganized on July 1, 1992, and selected Joseph Rakowski as the new president. Rakowski also became acting mayor and the third mayor in that year. Roman retained her seat on the city council and completed her term. She ran to fill the remainder of the unexpired term in the special election, but came in third out of a field of nineteen candidates.
