= Anthony R. Cucci =

American politician

40th Mayor of Jersey City
- In office July 1, 1985 – June 30, 1989
- Preceded by: Gerald McCann
- Succeeded by: Gerald McCann

Personal details
- Born: August 8, 1922 Jersey City, New Jersey
- Died: February 26, 2015 (aged 92) Jersey City, New Jersey
- Party: Democratic
- Spouse: Anna (d. December 1, 1988)
- Profession: Educator

Military service
- Allegiance: United States of America
- Branch/service: United States Marine Corps
- Years of service: 1943 – 1946
- Rank: Corporal
- Unit: 5th Marine Division
- Battles/wars: World War II

Anthony R. Cucci (August 8, 1922 – February 26, 2015) was an American educator and Democratic Party politician who served as the 40th Mayor of Jersey City from July 1, 1985, until June 30, 1989. Cucci served on the City Council from 1977 to 1981, and was a member of the board of education of the Jersey City Public Schools from 2000 until 2009.

== Early life ==
Born and raised in Jersey City, Cucci attended public schools. During World War II, Cucci served as a US Marine and fought in the Battle of Iwo Jima. Cucci attended Seton Hall University and taught in the Jersey City and New York City school systems.

== Political career ==
Cucci was elected to the Jersey City City Council in 1977 and served a single four-year term. He ran for mayor in 1981, coming in third in the general election behind New Jersey State Senator Wally Sheil and eventual winner Gerald McCann.

Cucci again ran for mayor in 1985, coming in first in the general election and forcing a runoff election with McCann. Cucci won the runoff, and was sworn in as Mayor of Jersey City at one minute after midnight on July 1, 1985.

While mayor, Cucci threatened to foreclose on the Statue of Liberty and sell it at auction due to an outstanding water bill of over $940,000 owed to the city by the United States Department of the Interior.

In 1988, Cucci established a sister city relationship between Jersey City and Cusco, Peru. While on a goodwill visit to Peru, Cucci's wife and the wife of Cusco Mayor Carlos Chacon were killed when the railroad car in which they were riding derailed and fell 700 feet off an embankment. The crash was suspected to have been caused by sabotage by either Maoist Shining Path guerrillas or a nationwide labor strike in Peru at the time. Peruvian authorities determined that the sabotage, a 10-inch steel rod wedged onto the tracks, was the work of guerillas.

Shortly after returning from Peru, Cucci announced his intention to seek re-election, Cucci came in fourth in the May 1989 general election behind former mayors Thomas F.X. Smith and McCann, as well as City Council President Glenn Dale Cunningham.

Cucci was elected to the Jersey City Board of Education in 2000, and served three terms. He lost his bid for re-election in 2009 when 12 people ran for three available seats.

Cucci was named to the Fashion Foundation of America's Best Dressed list in 1985.
