= James P. Dugan =

American lawyer and politician (1929–2021)

James P. Dugan (July 4, 1929 – December 12, 2021) was an American lawyer and politician in the Democratic Party who served in the New Jersey Senate and as chairman of the New Jersey Democratic State Committee.

Born and raised in Bayonne, New Jersey, Dugan attended St. Peter's Preparatory School, which he described in an interview as "the best learning experience I ever had".

Dugan served in the Korean War as a captain in the United States Marine Corps. After the war he studied at Fordham University School of Law, receiving a J.D. degree in 1957. He was admitted to the New York Bar in 1957 and the New Jersey Bar in 1959.

He was elected to the New Jersey State Senate in 1969, serving for eight years. In 1973 he was named chairman of the Senate Judiciary Committee. Also in that year he was selected as chairman of the New Jersey Democratic State Committee and helped nominate Brendan Byrne for Governor of New Jersey, though he would later become a critic of Byrne. Dugan stepped down from the party chairmanship in 1977 and also lost his Senate seat that year in a primary challenge.

Dugan joined the New Jersey law firm Waters, McPherson, McNeill in 1994. He had resided in Bayonne and Saddle River.

Dugan died on December 12, 2021, at the age of 92.

New Jersey General Assembly
Preceded by John J. Fekety; Addison McLeon	Member of the New Jersey General Assembly from the 12-A district 1970–1972; Served alongside: Joseph A. LeFante	Succeeded by David A. Wallace
New Jersey Senate
Preceded by Frank Joseph Guarini; Frederick H. Hauser	Member of the New Jersey Senate from the 12th district 1972–1974; Served alongside: William Musto, William F. Kelly	Succeeded by District eliminated
Preceded by District created	Member of the New Jersey Senate from the 31st district 1974–1978	Succeeded by Wally Sheil
Party political offices
Preceded by Salvatore A. Bontempo	Chairman of the New Jersey Democratic State Committee; 1973–1977	Succeeded by Richard J. Coffee
