= Joseph Rakowski =

American politician

Acting Mayor of Jersey City
- In office July 1, 1992 – November 10, 1992
- Preceded by: Marilyn Roman
- Succeeded by: Bret Schundler

Personal details
- Party: Democratic

Joseph Rakowski is an American Democratic Party politician who served as Acting Mayor of Jersey City, New Jersey. He became acting mayor when he was elected to serve as City Council President of Jersey City. Rakowski was the third person to hold the office in the same year.

== Biography ==
During his four-month term of office, Rakowski worked with New York City Mayor David Dinkins and New Jersey Attorney General Robert J. Del Tufo to address a problem where trucks full of garbage were being driven from New York City to Jersey City, New Jersey and their full trailers abandoned. Rakowski did not seek to complete the unexpired term as mayor in the special election that was held during his tenure. He was succeeded by Bret Schundler.
