= Gerald McCann =

American politician (born 1950)

39th and 41st Mayor of Jersey City
- In office July 1, 1981 – June 30, 1985
- Preceded by: Thomas F. X. Smith
- Succeeded by: Anthony R. Cucci
- In office July 1, 1989 – February 13, 1992
- Preceded by: Anthony R. Cucci
- Succeeded by: Marilyn Roman

Member of the Jersey City Board of Education
- In office 2007 – April 27, 2010

Personal details
- Born: March 20, 1950 (age 76) Jersey City, New Jersey
- Party: Democratic
- Relatives: Barbara McCann Stamato (sister)
- Profession: Accountant

Gerald McCann (born March 20, 1950) is an American Democratic Party politician who served two non-consecutive terms as mayor of Jersey City, New Jersey before being convicted of fraud in a savings-and-loan scam. When he was elected in 1981 he was the second-youngest mayor in the city's history.

== Biography ==
Born in the Greenville section of Jersey City on March 20, 1950, he served as mayor from 1981 to 1985, and again from 1989 to 1992. In 1992, he was indicted for mail fraud, bank fraud, tax evasion, making false statements to the IRS, and failure to file taxes. The prosecutor was then–United States Attorney Michael Chertoff. McCann said of the lead prosecutor, "It will become obvious that they were insane to bring this case in the first place; we are going to send Mr. Chertoff back to preparing wills. Maybe I can find him a job driving sanitation trucks in Jersey City." McCann was convicted on 15 of 16 counts. He spent two years in federal prison.

As a convicted felon, McCann was barred from running for political office again; after local City Council President Marilyn Roman served for four months, and the next local politician in line, local councilman Joseph Rakowski, served through the summer, he was later replaced by Bret Schundler, Jersey City's first registered Republican mayor since 1917, who would go on to win two full terms in office (1993–2001).

In February, 2010, McCann was hired as an inspector for the city's incinerator authority.
