= Thomas F. X. Smith =

American politician and author

38th Mayor of Jersey City
- In office July 1, 1977 – May 12, 1981
- Preceded by: Paul T. Jordan
- Succeeded by: Gerald McCann

Personal details
- Born: July 5, 1928 Jersey City, New Jersey
- Died: May 31, 1996 (aged 67) Jersey City, New Jersey
- Resting place: Holy Name Cemetery
- Party: Democratic
- Profession: Educator

Thomas Francis Xavier Smith (July 5, 1928 – May 31, 1996) was a reformist politician and author. He served as mayor of Jersey City, New Jersey, from 1977 to 1981.

== Career ==
Smith was affectionately known as "The Mouth That Roared" due to his outspoken criticism of the political cronyism and corruption for which Hudson County had long been infamous. Smith left the mayor's office for a bid for Governor of New Jersey in 1981, in which he finished sixth in a field of 13 candidates vying for the Democratic nomination, and was unsuccessful in a subsequent bid for the mayoralty of Jersey City in 1989.

Smith wrote Powerticians, a history of Jersey City politics and the attempts to remove the city from the grip of the political machine created by Frank Hague, Hudson County political boss and sometimes mayor of Jersey City. The book was published by Lyle Stuart, Inc., of Secaucus, New Jersey, in 1982. (ISBN 0-8184-0328-4).

== Personal life ==
Smith attended St. Peter's Preparatory School in Jersey City. He was a star basketball player at Saint Peter's College, New Jersey, where he earned an undergraduate degree with a major in English, and received a master's degree from Fordham University in educational psychology. He was director of placement at St. Peter's and a vice president of Hudson County Community College. Smith was drafted by the New York Knicks in the 1951 NBA draft.

Smith died of cancer in 1996, and is buried in Holy Name Cemetery, Jersey City.

== See also ==
- List of mayors of Jersey City, New Jersey

== Bibliography ==
- Smith, Thomas F. X. (1982), The Powerticians, Secaucus, New Jersey: Lyle Stuart, ISBN 0-8184-0328-4

Political offices
Preceded by Paul T. Jordan	Mayor of Jersey City; 1977–1981	Succeeded by Gerald McCann
