= List of Sicilian Americans =

The following is a list of notable Sicilian Americans. To be included in this list, the person must have a Wikipedia article showing they are Sicilian American or must be accompanied by references showing they are Sicilian American and are notable.

== Artists, writers, and musicians ==
- Carly Aquilino, (born November 18, 1990) stand-up comedian of Sicilian descent, podcast performer, cast member of MTV's Girl Code.
- Henry Armetta, (Palermo, Sicily, July 4, 1888 – San Diego, October 21, 1945) movie character actor who appeared in at least 150 films, starting in silents as early as 1915 to a movie released in 1946, after his death. In 1938, he played in Everybody Sing with Judy Garland, Allan Jones, and Fanny Brice. In 1941, he was hilarious as the father of an Italian family shopping for beds in "The Big Store" with the Marx Brothers and Tony Martin. He appeared in at least 24 films in 1934 alone, sometimes uncredited.
- Romina Arena, Palermo, Sicily, May 12, 1980 operatic pop / pop classical crossover singer-songwriter and published author now living in Los Angeles.
- Armand Assante, (born October 4, 1949) born in New York City to a Sicilian father and an Irish mother. Assante is an accomplished character actor, with his big break coming in 1974 in The Lords of Flatbush. His sometimes sinister look has made him a popular choice for movies and television.
- Dodici Azpadu, (born c. 1945) one of the few American novelists writing from a distinctly Sicilian-American and lesbian perspective. She has also published several volumes of poetry.
- Joseph Barbera, born Joseph Roland Barbera (March 24, 1911 – December 18, 2006) animator, cartoon artist, storyboard artist, director, producer and co-founder, together with William Hanna of Hanna-Barbera (now known as Cartoon Network Studios). The studio produced well-known cartoons such as The Huckleberry Hound Show, The Flintstones, The Jetsons and Scooby-Doo.
- Paul Barresi, (born January 12, 1949) American actor, private investigator and media personality best known for his unique persona and natural muscled physic on film and in photographs, including the movie Perfect and in photo essays such as the sell out [1975] Playgirl photo essay in which he was featured with Cassandra Peterson, aka, Elvira - Mistress of the Dark.
- Chazz Palminteri, (born May 15, 1952) American actor and writer, best known for his performances in The Usual Suspects, A Bronx Tale, Mulholland Falls and his Academy Award-nominated role for Best Supporting Actor in Bullets Over Broadway.
- Sonny Bono, born Salvatore Phillip Bono (February 16, 1935 – January 5, 1998) American record producer, singer, actor and politician whose career spanned over three decades.
- Argentina Brunetti, (August 31, 1907 – December 20, 2005) actress and writer. She followed Mimi Aguglia, her famous mother's footsteps in the theater. She began her movie debut in the Frank Capra classic It's a Wonderful Life (1946), as Mrs. Martini. Throughout her varied career she has also written and performed in daily radio shows, became a member of the 'Hollywood Foreign Press Association', writing numerous articles on Hollywood personalities, authored books, written music and acted in over 57 television programs and 68 movies in which she mainly played multi-ethnic roles. She hosted a weekly weblog on the Internet, called Argentina Brunetti's Hollywood Stories, which her son plans to continue running, and has written a biographical novel called In Sicilian Company.
- Steve Buscemi, (born December 13, 1957, in Brooklyn, New York) actor.
- Frank Capra, (May 18, 1897 – September 3, 1991) American film director and a major creative force behind a number of highly popular films. Born Francesco Rosario Capra in Bisacquino, Sicily, Capra moved with his family to America in 1903, settling in Los Angeles.
- Vivian Cash, (April 23, 1934 – May 24, 2005) was an American author. She was the first wife of singer Johnny Cash and the inspiration for his first hit single I Walk The Line. Vivian’s two paternal grandparents were from Cefalù, Sicily. Her family roots in Cefalù go back over 300 years.
- Richard S. Castellano, (September 4, 1933 – December 10, 1988) actor, became famous as Pete Clemenza in The Godfather
- Iron Eyes Cody, (April 3, 1904 – January 4, 1999) actor born in Kaplan, Louisiana. He was born Espera DeCorti, the son of Sicilian immigrants Francesca Salpietra and Antonio De Corti. He was not born a Native American, but he claimed to be part Cherokee and part Cree. Cody and his wife Bertha Parker adopted children that were Native American. Cody began his acting career at the age of 12 and continued to work until the time of his death. In 1996, The Times-Picayune exposed his true heritage, but Cody denied it.
- Dan Cortese, (born September 14, 1967, near Pittsburgh, Pennsylvania) actor. Born in the Pittsburgh suburb of Sewickley, Pennsylvania, Cortese first came to prominence as host of MTV Sports from 1992 to 1993. He has had starring roles in the 1993 remake of Route 66, Traps, Melrose Place, The Single Guy, Veronica's Closet, and Ball & Chain
- Paul Creston (1906–1985), composer of classical music
- Russ (born 1992), rapper
- Alan Dale, (July 9, 1926 – April 20, 2002) singer of traditional popular and rock and roll music. He was born Aldo Sigismondi in the Brooklyn borough of New York. His father, Aristide Sigismondi, immigrated to the United States from Abruzzi, Italy in 1904 at the age of 21, and became a comedian in Italian-language theater, with a radio program of his own. His mother, Agata "Kate" Sigismondi, was born in Messina, Sicily, and was 15 years younger than Aristide.
- Arturo Di Modica New York City artist, born in Sicily, best known for his sculpture Charging Bull (also known as the "Wall Street Bull"), which he installed without permission in front of the New York Stock Exchange in December 1989. The piece is now on loan to the New York City Department of Parks and Recreation who has placed it in nearby Bowling Green park. Di Modica now lives in New York City
- Vincent D'Onofrio, (born Vincent Phillip D'Onofrio June 30, 1959, in Brooklyn, New York) actor and producer, best known as Detective Robert Goren in Law & Order: Criminal Intent. D'Onofrio's parents Gennaro (Gene) D'Onofrio and Phyllis D'Onofrio, are both of Sicilian descent.
- Dennis Farina, (February 29, 1944 – July 22, 2013) born in Chicago, actor in television and motion pictures; formerly a Chicago policeman.
- Ben Gazzara, (August 28, 1930 – February 3, 2012) born Biagio Anthony Gazzara in New York City) actor in television and motion pictures. Born to Sicilian immigrants, Antonio Gazzara and Angela Consumano, Gazzara grew up on New York's tough Lower East Side.
- Leila George, (born Leila George D'Onofrio on March 20, 1992, in Sydney, Australia) actress. George's parents are American actor Vincent D'Onofrio who is Sicilian descent and Australian actress Greta Scacchi.
- Charlie Gracie (born Charles Anthony Graci in South Philadelphia, 1936; d. 2022), rock and roll and rhythm and blues singer and guitarist
- Lino Graglia, Dalton Cross Professor of Law at the University of Texas specializing in antitrust litigation. He obtained a BA from the City College of New York in 1952, and an LLB from Columbia University in 1954. He worked in the United States Department of Justice during the administration of President Dwight D. Eisenhower. Graglia is an outspoken Catholic conservative of Sicilian background. He is a well known critic of affirmative action and racial quotas.
- Alicia Keys, (born January 25, 1981) singer-songwriter, record producer, pianist and actress. She is an international pop star. Her real name is Alicia Augello Cook. Her mother, Teresa Augello, is of Sicilian descent (from Sciacca).
- Ariana Grande, (born June 26, 1993) American actress and singer. She is an international pop star. She is of Italian descent, half Sicilian (through her father Edward Butera), half Abruzzese. Her older brother is actor-producer Frankie Grande.
- Frankie Laine, (born Frank Paul LoVecchio March 30, 1913 – February 6, 2007), influential American singer. Frankie's parents emigrated from Monreale, Sicily to Chicago's "Little Sicily". At 17 he sang before a crowd of 5,000 at The Merry Garden Ballroom to such enthusiastic applause that he ended up performing five encores on his first night. But success as a singer was another 17 years away. Frankie Laine's 70-plus year career spanned most of the 20th century and continued into the 21st. Laine was a key figure in the golden age of popular music, and remains, quite possibly the greatest singer of all time. On June 12, 1996, he was presented with a Lifetime Achievement Award at the 27th Annual Songwriters’ Hall of Fame awards ceremony at the New York Sheraton.
- Matteo Lane, (born 1982) comedian whose maternal family comes from Agrigento.
- Cyndi Lauper, (born June 22, 1953), Cynthia Ann Stephanie Lauper, better known as Cyndi Lauper, singer whose melodic voice and wild costumes have come to epitomize the 1980s, the decade in which she first came to fame. She was born in Queens, New York to Swiss German-American Fred Lauper and Sicilian Italian-American Catrine Dominique.
- Nick LaRocca (1889–1961), American early jazz trumpeter and the leader of the Original Dixieland Jass Band. He is the composer of one of the most recorded jazz classics of all-time, "Tiger Rag". He was part of what is generally regarded as the first recorded jazz band, a band which recorded and released the first jazz recording, "Livery Stable Blues" in 1917.
- Frank Lentini, born Francesco A. Lentini (1889–1966) born in Syracuse, Sicily, into a large family. He was born with three longer legs, two sets of genitals and one rudimentary foot on his third leg. His primary legs also grew into different lengths. At the age of nine, Lentini moved to the United States and entered the sideshow business.
- Robert Loggia, born Salvatore Loggia (January 3, 1930 – December 4, 2015) American actor and director. His father, Biagio Loggia, was a shoemaker born in Palma di Montechiaro, Agrigento, Sicily, and his mother, Elena Blandino, a homemaker born in Vittoria, Ragusa, Sicily.
- Patti LuPone, (born April 21, 1949, in Northport, New York) American singer and actress of Sicilian descent. She is a graduate of Northport High School. An important player in contemporary American musical theater, she has performed on Broadway in works by Andrew Lloyd Webber, Stephen Sondheim and others. She won a Tony Award for Evita in 1980.
- John Lurie (b. 1952), musician, composer, actor, and painter
- Matteo Marchisano-Adamo, born February 19, 1973, in Flint, Michigan, filmmaker and composer whose mother's family comes from Erice, Sicily.
- Joe Mantegna, (born Joseph Anthony Mantegna Jr., November 13, 1947, in Chicago) actor, writer and director whose family comes from Calascibetta, Sicily.
- Leo Martello, (1931–2000) author, lecturer, gay civil rights activist, and an early voice in the American Neopagan movement. He drew heavily on his Sicilian heritage, teaching the Strega Tradition which was named after the Italian word for Witch. As a founder of the Witches Anti-Defamation League (later the Alternative Religions Education Network) he was known for his lively and sometimes confrontational style. For example, in his books he tried to popularize the "Witches' Curse" which was "I wish you on yourself". He was profiled in Margot Adler's Drawing Down the Moon.
- Natalie Merchant, (born October 26, 1963, in Jamestown, New York) versatile musician. Merchant co-founded and fronted the successful band 10,000 Maniacs in 1981, but left the band in 1993 for a solo career. Her father's original Italian name was Mercante but was Americanized into Merchant. Her mother's side is Irish.
- Sal Mineo, born Salvatore Mineo, Jr. (January 10, 1939 – February 12, 1976) American actor and theater director, famous for his Academy Award-nominated performance opposite James Dean in the film Rebel Without a Cause. Mineo, born in The Bronx, New York City as the son of a Sicilian coffin maker, was enrolled by his mother in dancing and acting school at an early age.
- Vincente Minnelli, (February 28, 1910 – July 25, 1986) born in Chicago, IL; noted film director; also father of Academy Award winning actress Liza Minnelli; he was of half-Sicilian heritage on his paternal side.
- Mario Nugara, American ballet artist, director and teacher. He is the founder and artistic director of the City of Angels Ballet School. Artistic Director of the California Riverside Ballet from 2010 to 2015. He was born in Pittsburgh, Pennsylvania, of Italian (Sicilian) and Polish descent. He is the subject of television documentary "Turning Point, City of Angels Ballet" and is featured in the book "Unselfish, Love Thy Neighbor As Thy Selfie".
- Nick Oliveri, (born October 21, 1971, in Palm Desert, California) musician. He plays bass guitar, acoustic guitar, electric guitar, and is a vocalist. His main music project is Mondo Generator, which he has fronted since 1997. He is most widely known for his work with Queens of the Stone Age. His far Sicilian origins are visible in the typical surname.
- Al Pacino, born Alfredo James Pacino (born April 25, 1940, in The Bronx, New York) American film actor. Pacino is the son of Salvatore Pacino (who was born in Sicily) and Rose Gerardi (the daughter of a Sicilian born father and a New York-born mother of Sicilian descent). His parents divorced while Pacino was still a child. His maternal grandparents originate from Corleone, Sicily, while his paternal grandparents originate from San Fratello, Sicily.
- Louis Prima, born into a musical family of Sicilian descent in New Orleans. He studied violin for several years as a child. His older brother Leon Prima was a well regarded local bandleader. Prima was proud of his heritage, and made a point of letting the audience know at every performance that he was Sicilian -American and from New Orleans. His singing and playing showed that he absorbed many of the same influences as his fellow Crescent City musician, Louis Armstrong, particularly in his hoarse voice and scat singing.
- Mario Puzo, (October 15, 1920 – July 2, 1999) American author known for his fictional books about the Mafia. Puzo was born into a family of Sicilian immigrants living in the "Hell's Kitchen" neighborhood of New York City. Many of his books draw heavily on this Sicilian heritage.
- Gregorio Prestopino, (June 29, 1907 – December 16, 1984) Italian American artist that was known for his Depression error artwork, as well as his depictions of Italian art. He was born and grew up in Little Italy, Manhattan, to Antonino Prestopino and Letteria Rando, both of whom immigrated from Messina, Sicily.
- Marco Rafalà, first-generation descendant of immigrants from Melilli, Sicily. He is the author of the novel, How Fires End, a work of historical fiction set in World War II Sicily and 1980s America.
- Matthew Randazzo V, (born March 13, 1984, in New Orleans) American true crime writer and historian known for his work on the American Mafia.
- Leah Remini, (born June 15, 1970, in Brooklyn, New York) actress. She is best known for her role as Carrie Heffernan on the sitcom The King of Queens. Her father George Remini, owner of an asbestos company, originates from Sicily. Her mother Vicki Marshall, a high school principal, is Jewish.
- Giovanni Ribisi, born Giovanni Antonino Ribisi (born December 17, 1974, in Los Angeles, California) actor. His father, Albert Anthony Ribisi, is a musician. Ribisi's paternal grandfather was the son of farmers from Sicily.
- Pete Rugolo, (born December 25, 1915) Sicilian-born composer and arranger. He was born in Patti, Sicily, but his parents emigrated to the United States in 1920 and settled in Santa Rosa, California. He started his musical career playing the baritone, like his father, but he quickly branched out into other instruments, notably the French horn and the piano. He is most famous for his writing for the Stan Kenton Orchestra, although he led a long and successful career as a composer and arranger based in Los Angeles for many years. He has written for the Four Freshmen (for whom he was musical director) and many others.
- Nikki Sixx, (born December 11, 1958) musician, songwriter, record producer, author, photographer, and radio personality, best known as the co-founder, bassist, primary songwriter, and only constant member of the heavy metal band Mötley Crüe. He is of Sicilian descent on his father's side, from Calascibetta (Province of Enna).
- Martin Scorsese, (pronounced as Scor-SEH-see) (born November 17, 1942, in Queens, New York, US) multi-Oscar nominated film director. Martin Scorsese came from a working class Sicilian-American family, hailing from the Sicilian town of Polizzi Generosa; his father Luciano Charles Scorsese (1913–1993) was a pants presser in New York's garment district. He struggled to earn enough money to attend university, but has shown enormous gratitude to his parents for helping him realize his dreams. His parents were the subject of Scorsese's documentary Italianamerican and made numerous cameo appearances in his films before their deaths. For years, his mother worked as the official caterer for all of Scorsese's films and his father helped in the wardrobe department.
- Gia Scala, born Josefina Grazia Scoglio in Liverpool, England, to a Sicilian father, Pietro Scoglio, and an Irish mother, Eileen O'Sullivan. Raised from infancy in Sicily, she moved to the United States at age sixteen where she graduated Bayside High School and later worked in New York City. She studied acting and in 1954 was signed to a contract by Universal Studios in Hollywood where her name was changed to Gia Scala. She received wide recognition for her performance of "Anna" in The Guns of Navarone (1961 film). Her life ended with an accidental drug overdose in 1972. Gia Scala is interred in the Holy Cross Cemetery in Culver City, California.
- Vincent Schiavelli (November 10, 1948 – December 26, 2005), noted character actor known for his work in film and on television. He was born into a Sicilian/Italian-American family in Brooklyn, New York. He studied acting through the Theater Program at New York University and began working on the stage in the 1960s. Having a respected Sicilian chef for a grandfather rubbed off on Vincent Schiavelli, as he is also the author of a number of cookbooks and food articles for magazines and newspapers. He received a James Beard Foundation Journalism Award in 2001 and has been nominated on a number of other occasions. He succumbed to lung cancer at age 57, dying at his home in Polizzi Generosa, Italy, the town in Sicily where his grandfather emigrated from and which he wrote about in his 2002 book, Many Beautiful Things: Stories and Recipes from Polizzi Generosa (ISBN 0-7432-1528-1).
- Frank Sinatra, born Francis Albert Sinatra (December 12, 1915 – May 14, 1998) American singer considered one of the finest vocalists of all time, renowned for his impeccable phrasing and timing. Many critics place him alongside Bing Crosby, Elvis Presley, and The Beatles as the most important popular music figures of the 20th century. Sinatra launched a second career as a dramatic film actor, and became admired for a screen persona distinctly tougher than his smooth singing style. Sinatra also had a larger-than-life presence in the public eye, and as "The chairman of the board" became an American icon, known for his brash, sometimes swaggering attitude, as embodied by his signature song "My Way". He was born in Hoboken, New Jersey, as the only child of a quiet Sicilian fireman father, Anthony Martin Sinatra (1894–1969). Anthony had emigrated to the United States in 1895. His mother, Natalie Della Gavarante (1896–1977), talented, tempestuous Ligurian, who worked as a part-time abortion provider. She was known was "Dolly", and emigrated in 1897.
- Tony Sirico, (July 29, 1942 – July 8, 2022) actor most famous for his role as Paulie Walnuts on the HBO television series The Sopranos. Prior to becoming an actor, Sirico spent some time in jail for holding up a number of night clubs in the late 1960s and early 1970s. While in prison, he became interested in acting from watching a theater group that came to perform. When he got out of jail, Sirico played gangsters in a number of films.
- Britney Spears, born Britney Jean Spears (December 2, 1981, in McComb, Mississippi) is an American recording artist and entertainer. Her grandmother Lilian Irene Portelli was an English immigrant, of part-Italian Maltese descent.
- Tommy Tallarico, born Thomas V. Tallarico (born February 18, 1968) accomplished American video game music composer.
- Richard Termini (born June 20, 1956, Brooklyn, New York) is an American educator, platinum record award winning musician, composer, film director, writer and photographer. His grandfather, Giuseppe Termini, founder of Termini Bakery in Brooklyn, New York, was born in Sciacca, Sicily, and immigrated to the United States c. 1896 with his parents. Termini's paternal genetic lineage is of the somewhat rare Haplogroup T-M184.
- Robert Thorburn (born January 10, 1974 in Suffolk County, New York), professionally known as R.A. the Rugged Man, rapper and producer
- Johnny Thunders, born John Anthony Genzale, Jr. (July 15, 1952 – April 23, 1991) rock and roll guitarist and singer, first with the New York Dolls, the proto-punk glam rockers of the early 1970s. During the late 1970s, he was a familiar figure on the New York punk scene, both with The Heartbreakers and as a solo artist. His guitar work was highly influential in punk rock music.
- Aida Turturro, (born September 25, 1962) actress who is best known for playing Janice Soprano, sister of New Jersey mob boss, Tony Soprano, on the HBO television series The Sopranos, a role which netted her an Emmy Award nomination.
- John Turturro, (born February 28, 1957) American actor. He has appeared in over sixty movies, and is well known for his ability to effortlessly change both his demeanour and physique. Turturro was born in Brooklyn, New York to a Sicilian Catholic family. He completed his MFA at the Yale School of Drama. He worked as an extra in Raging Bull (1980).
- Mark Valenti, (born June 29), American writer for television, films and books.
- Frank Vincent, (born Frank Vincent Gattuso on August 4, 1939) Italian-American actor. He was born in North Adams, Massachusetts, but was raised in Jersey City, New Jersey. His father was also called Frank. His mother was Mary (née Ricci). Frank has two brothers: Nick and Jimmy. Frank's father was one of six children, all born in the USA to Sicilian immigrants Niccolò Gattuso and Francesca di Peri. He was spotted by Martin Scorsese in a low-budget gangster movie called Death Collector. Scorsese was impressed and hired Vincent to star in Raging Bull. Joe Pesci co-starred with Vincent in The Death Collector and the two were reunited in several other movies; another familiar co-star of Vincent is Robert De Niro.
- Tony Vitale, born "Anthony Neal Vitale" born May 24, 1964, in The Bronx, New York, American film writer, director, producer. His films, Kiss Me Guido, Very Mean Men and One Last Ride have included many characters of Sicilian descent. Vitale is the son of Anthony Ralph Vitale and Mildred (Carmela) Italiano, daughter of immigrants from Agrigento, Sicily.
- Guy Williams, (January 14, 1924 – May 7, 1989), born Armando Joseph Catalano in New York City, the son of Sicilian immigrants. He was an American actor who played swashbuckling action heroes in the 1950s and 1960s. An accomplished fencer, his most famous role was Zorro in two Walt Disney movies and television series of that name (1957–1959) and also in Lost in Space, as the father of the Robinson family. Nearly a half-century later, Zorro is still being aired all over South America, from Argentina to Venezuela, in some places twice daily. Zorro continues to be the most popular U.S. series ever to have appeared on South American television.
- Frances Winwar, (1900–1985), born Francesca Vinciguerra in Sicily, was a biographer, translator, and fiction writer.
- Frank Zappa, born Frank Vincent Zappa (December 21, 1940 – December 4, 1993) was a composer, guitarist, singer and satirist. In his 33-year musical career, Zappa proved to be one of the most prolific musicians ever, releasing over 60 albums during his life. His father, Francis Zappa was born in Alcamo, Sicily. His mother Rose Marie Colimore was of, 3/4 Italian and 1/4 French descent.
- Philip Zimbardo, (born March 23, 1933) American psychologist, best known for his Stanford prison experiment and bestselling introductions to psychology. Zimbardo was born to Sicilian parents, George Zimbardo and Margaret Bisicchia and grew up in New York City, in the South Bronx.
- Lady Gaga, (born March 28, 1986) American singer-songwriter. Her father Joseph was born in Sicily.
- Jon Bon Jovi, born John Francis Bongiovi, Jr., in Perth Amboy, New Jersey, some of his father's ancestors were from Sciacca, near Agrigento in Sicily.
- Liza Minnelli, (born March 12, 1946) American actress and singer. She is the daughter of actress and singer Judy Garland and Garland's second husband, film director Vincente Minnelli who was the son of a Sicilian immigrant.
- Tony Danza, (born April 21, 1951) American actor best known for starring on the television series Taxi and Who's the Boss? Danza was born Anthony Salvatore Iadanza in Brooklyn, New York, to parents Anne Cammisa (1925–1993) and Matty Iadanza (1920–1983). Anne was born in Campobello di Mazara, Trapani, Sicily and immigrated to the United States with five brothers and sisters in 1929. Danza is a full blooded Sicilian American.
- Eve Mauro, (born December 21, 1981) actress and model born in Atlanta, Georgia. Her father, Antonio Alfio Di Mauro was born in Catania, Sicily on September 7, 1934.
- Robert Davi, (born June 26, 1951) actor, singer, writer, and director. Davi was born in Astoria, Queens, New York, the son of Maria (née Rulli) and Sal Davi. His mother was an Italian American whose family came from Nusco, Avellino, Campania and his father was from Torretta, Palermo, Sicily. Davi has performed in more than 130 films. Among his most known roles are opera-singing heavy Jake Fratelli in The Goonies (1985), Vietnam veteran and FBI Special Agent Johnson in Die Hard (1988), James Bond villain Franz Sanchez in Licence to Kill (1989), police deputy chief Phil Heinemann in Predator 2 (1990) and strip club manager Al Torres in Showgirls (1995). On television, he portrayed FBI Special Agent Bailey Malone in the NBC television series Profiler (1996–2000).
- Michael Giacchino, (born October 10, 1967) American musician and composer of music for films, television and video games. Giacchino was born in Riverside Township, New Jersey. His father's ancestors were Italians, hailing from Sicily and his mother's ancestors emigrated from Abruzzo in central Italy; he holds dual American and Italian citizenship. Giacchino grew up in Edgewater Park Township, New Jersey. He graduated from Holy Cross High School in Delran Township, New Jersey in 1986 He has received an Academy Award, a Primetime Emmy Award, and three Grammy Awards. He is known for his collaborations with J. J. Abrams, Brad Bird, Matt Reeves, Pete Docter, Colin Trevorrow, Jon Watts, Drew Goddard, The Wachowskis and Thomas Bezucha. His film scores include several films from the Mission: Impossible, Jurassic Park and Star Trek series, seven Pixar Animation Studios films, Super 8, Dawn of the Planet of the Apes, Zootopia, Doctor Strange, Rogue One: A Star Wars Story, and Spider-Man: Far From Home, and The Batman. He also composed the score of the video game series Medal of Honor and Call of Duty and the television series Alias, Lost and Fringe.
- John Travolta

== Athletes ==
- Charles Atlas (1892–1972), born Angelo Siciliano in Acri, Calabria, Italy, he moved to Brooklyn, New York at a young age. Initially a small, weak child, Siciliano worked hard to tone his muscles, using a variety of weights. Contemplating the strength of a tiger in a zoo, he conceived the idea of working muscle against muscle, rather than working out with weights. Using this system, later dubbed dynamic tension, he acquired a physique that earned him the nickname "Charles Atlas", after the mythical Atlas, the Titan who held up the heavens. He later filed for and received trademark status for the name. He soon took the role of strongman in the Coney Island Circus Sideshow. His company, Charles Atlas, Ltd. (1929-and continuing today) markets a fitness program for the "97-pound weakling", a registered trademark. Not of Sicilian descent, family originated from Calabria.
- Dom DiMaggio, born Dominic Paul DiMaggio on February 12, 1917, in San Francisco, former center fielder in Major League Baseball who played his entire career for the Boston Red Sox (1940–42, 1946–53). His small stature (standing five feet nine inches) and eyeglasses earned him the nickname "The Little Professor". He is the brother of outfielders Joe DiMaggio and Vince DiMaggio. DiMaggio was a teammate and close friend of Ted Williams, Bobby Doerr, and Johnny Pesky. Their friendship was chronicled in David Halberstam's book The Teammates. Dom DiMaggio was inducted to the Boston Red Sox Hall of Fame in 1995.
- James Maritato (born March 12, 1972) American professional wrestler better known by the ring names Little Guido and Nunzio. He is best known for his work in World Wrestling Entertainment and Extreme Championship Wrestling.
- Joe DiMaggio, born Giuseppe Paolo DiMaggio Jr. (November 25, 1914 – March 8, 1999), nicknamed "Joltin' Joe" and "The Yankee Clipper", was a Sicilian-American center fielder in Major League Baseball who played his entire career (1936–1951) for the New York Yankees. The eighth of nine children, DiMaggio was born in a two-room house in Martinez, California, to Sicilian immigrants who came from Isola delle Femmine, near Palermo; delivered by a midwife. His mother, Rosalia, named him "Giuseppe" for his father; "Paolo" was in honor of Saint Paul, Giuseppe's favorite saint. The family moved to San Francisco when Joe was one year old.
- Vince DiMaggio, Vincent Paul DiMaggio (September 6, 1912 – October 3, 1986) Major League Baseball center fielder and right-handed batter who played in the National League for the Boston Bees (1937–38), Cincinnati Reds (1939–40), Pittsburgh Pirates (1940–46) and New York Giants (1946). The older brother of Joe and Dom, DiMaggio was born in Martinez, California.
- Johnny Dundee, (November 22, 1893–April 22, 1965) featherweight and junior lightweight boxer who fought from 1910 until 1932. Dundee was born Giuseppe Carrora in Sciacca, Sicily, but was raised in the United States. Although today he is almost completely forgotten, Dundee was highly regarded by many old time boxing experts. The Ring founder and editor, Nat Fleischer, rated Dundee in the top five of his list of greatest featherweights of all time.
- Robert James "Gino" Marella (June 4, 1937 – October 6, 1999), better known by his ring name of Gorilla Monsoon, was an American professional wrestler, play-by-play announcer, and booker. Marella is also a member of the Ithaca College Athletic Hall of Fame and placed second in the 1959 NCAA National Wrestling championship tournament.
- Joe Montana (born June 11, 1956), former U.S. National Football League quarterback who played for the San Francisco 49ers (1979-1992) and the Kansas City Chiefs (1993-1994). He is a four-time Super Bowl champion and two-time regular season MVP who also holds the record for highest passer rating in Super Bowl history. In 1999, ESPN ranked him the 25th greatest athlete of the 20th century and he is universally considered to be one of the greatest quarterbacks of all time.
- Paul Malignaggi (born November 23, 1980), professional junior welterweight boxer and a former IBF Junior Welterweight Champion most notable for defeating Lovemore N'dou twice, as well as losing in bouts with Miguel Cotto and Ricky Hatton.
- Mike Piazza, born Michael Joseph Piazza (September 4, 1968, in Norristown, Pennsylvania) U.S. Major League Baseball player. He is generally recognized as the top-hitting catcher of all time. He is a ten time All-Star. On May 5, 2004, Piazza surpassed Carlton Fisk for most home runs by a catcher with the 352nd of his career. Mike grew up for the first few years of his life in a small house in Phoenixville, Pennsylvania. The house was barely big enough to have Mike's entire family inside. His family consisted of his two parents, Vince and Veronica Piazza, and his brothers Vince Jr., Danny, Tony and Tommy.
- Christian Pulisic (born September 18, 1998), soccer midfielder with AC Milan and the U.S. national team, has a Sicilian grandmother.
- Gene Sarazen, (also known as Gene Saraceni) (February 27, 1902 – May 13, 1999) one of the few golfers to win all the major championships in his career.
- Roman Reigns, born Leati Joseph Anoa'i (May 25, 1985) is an American professional wrestler and former football player who currently wrestles for WWE. His mother is of Sicilian descent

== Businesspeople ==
- Frank Cannova, (Jan 14, 1911 – November 29, 2005) Florida hotelier, businessman and entrepreneur.
- Joe Plumeri, President and CEO of Willis Group Holdings, and owner of the Trenton Thunder.
- Rachael Ray, popular talk show host and TV chef who has had several shows on the Food Network and in syndication.
- Judith Regan (born August 17, 1953) book publisher and talk show host. She launched the careers of novelists Wally Lamb, Jess Walter, Gregory Maguire, Walter Kirn, and Doug Coupland. She has published Howard Stern, Michael Moore, General Tommy Franks, and legendary journalists, artists, historians, designers and hundreds more. She hosts a show on SiriusXm and hosted a television show for 9 years on the Fox News Channel. She is Sicilian and Irish.
- Anthony T. Rossi (1900–1993) born as Antonio Talamo Rossi in Messina, Sicily. He had the equivalent of a high school education. He emigrated to the United States when he was 21 years old and educated himself to the point that he became an expert mathematician and mechanical engineer. He founded Tropicana Products, a producer of orange juice founded in 1947 in Bradenton, Florida, in the United States which grew from 50 employees to over 8,000 in 2004, expanding into multiple product lines and became one of the world's largest producers and marketers of citrus juice.

== Criminals ==
- Sam Maceo (1894–1951) and Rosario Maceo (1887–1954) were organized crime bosses in Galveston, Texas. They are credited with having made the island city a nationally known resort town from Prohibition through the end of World War II during the city's "open era".
- Lucky Luciano, considered to be the father of the American Mafia.
- Carlos Marcello, New Orleans Mafia boss who was at one time linked to the assassination of John F. Kennedy.

== Jazz artists ==
- Sharkey Bonano, (April 9, 1904 – March 27, 1972) born with the name Joseph Gustaf Bonano in the Milenburg neighborhood of New Orleans, Louisiana, by the shores of Lake Pontchartrain. He sometimes billed himself as Sharkey Banana or Sharkey Bananas.
- Chick Corea, born Armando Anthony Corea (June 12, 1941 – February 9, 2021)
- Eddie Costa, (1930–1962) jazz pianist based in Pittsburgh, Pennsylvania.
- Steve Gadd, (born April 9, 1945, Rochester, New York)
- Jimmy Giuffre, born James Peter Giuffre (Dallas, Texas, 1921).
- Vince Guaraldi, (July 17, 1927 – February 6, 1976) famous jazz pianist, known for his hit single "Cast Your Fate to the Wind" and for composing and performing the soundtrack of the Peanuts television specials.
- Scott LaFaro, born Rocco Scott LaFaro (April 3, 1936, Newark, New Jersey – July 6, 1961, Flint, New York). Not of Sicilian descent, family originated from Calabria.
- Papa Jack Laine, born George Vital Laine aka Papa Jack (September 21, 1873 – June 1, 1966).
- Eddie Lang, (October 25, 1902 – March 26, 1933), born Salvatore Massaro, son of an Italian-American instrument maker in Philadelphia.
- Nick LaRocca, born Dominic James La Rocca (New Orleans, April 11, 1889 – New Orleans, February 22, 1961).
- Joe Lovano, born Joseph Salvatore Lovano (December 29, 1952, in Cleveland, Ohio). His father's family comes from the village of Alcara li Fusi and his mother's family from the village of Cesarò.
- Chuck Mangione, (born November 29, 1940). Also brother Gaspare "Gap", a musician and Uncle Gerlando "Jerre", an Author.
- Wingy Manone, born Joseph Matthews Mannone (sic), (February 13, 1900, New Orleans – July 9, 1982.
- Charlie Mariano (born 1923)
- Joe Marsala (1907–1978)
- Pat Martino, born Pat Azzara (August 25, 1944) in South Philadelphia
- Joe Morello, (July 17, 1929 – March 12, 2011), in Springfield, Massachusetts
- Joe Pass, born Joseph Anthony Passalaqua, January 13, 1929, New Brunswick, New Jersey – May 23, 1994, Los Angeles.
- John Patitucci, born 1959 in Brooklyn, New York
- Art Pepper, (1925–1982) (Sicilian mother)
- Louis Prima, (December 7, 1910 – August 24, 1978). Prima was born into a musical family of Sicilian descent in New Orleans. Prima was proud of his heritage, and made a point of letting the audience know at every performance that he was Italian-American and from New Orleans.
- Leon Roppolo, (March 16, 1902 – October 5, 1943). Leon Joseph Roppolo (nicknamed "Rap") was born in Lutcher, Louisiana, upriver from New Orleans
- Frank Rosolino, (August 20, 1926, Detroit – November 26, 1978, Los Angeles)
- Tony Scott, (1921–2007)
- George Wallington, born Giacinto Figlia, October 27, 1923, Palermo, Sicily – Cape Coral, Miami, February 15, 1993).

== Politicians ==
- Joseph L. Alioto, (February 12, 1916 – January 29, 1998), Mayor of San Francisco 1968–1976.
- Vincent R. Impellitteri, (February 4, 1900 – January 29, 1987) appointed Acting Mayor of New York City upon the resignation of then Mayor William O'Dwyer, on September 1, 1950. He served from 1950 to 1953. Impellitteri moved with his family to the United States from Sicily as an infant in 1901. Trivia: Impellitteri believed his name to be too difficult to spell by most people. When running for mayor he tried to persuade a judge to allow voters to simply write "Impy" on their ballots. The judge refused the request.
- The families of 6 members of the United States Congress emigrated from Sicily:
  - Daniel Frisa member of the United States House of Representatives from 1995 to 1997.
  - Nick Lampson His family emigrated from the region of Salemi, Trapani.
  - Frank LoBiondo His family emigrated from the region of Belmonte Mezzagno, Palermo.
  - Donald A. Manzullo City not known.
  - Frank Pallone City not known.
  - Vito Fossella Representative from New York
- John Ferruggio, (1925–2010) – led the evacuation of Pan Am Flight 93, which was hijacked in 1970
- Ferdinand Pecora, (January 6, 1882 – December 7, 1971) born in Nicosia, Sicily, the son of Louis Pecora and Rosa Messina who emigrated to the United States and New York City with his parents. He earned a law degree from the New York Law School and eventually worked as an assistant district attorney. He led Senate hearings into the causes of the Wall Street Crash of 1929 that launched a major reform of the American financial system. Pecora personally undertook many of the interrogations during the hearings, including high profile Wall Street personalities such as Richard Whitney, president of the New York Stock Exchange and investment bankers Thomas W. Lamont, Otto H. Kahn, Albert H. Wiggin, and Charles E. Mitchell. Pecora's high-profile work led to the hearings being called the Pecora Commission and it put him on the June 12, 1933, cover of Time.
- Antonin Scalia, (March 11, 1936 – February 13, 2016) (sometimes known by the nickname "Nino") was a U.S. Supreme Court Associate Justice since 1986. He was widely considered the leading originalist voice on the Court and one of the most outspoken defenders of textualism. Antonin Scalia was born in Trenton, New Jersey, to his mother, Catherine, and his father, S. Eugene. His mother was born in the United States; his father, a professor of romance languages, emigrated from Sicily at age 15. When Scalia was five years old, his family moved to Queens, New York City, during which time his father worked at Brooklyn College.
- Jack Valenti, (September 5, 1921 – April 26, 2007) "special assistant" to Lyndon Johnson's White House. In 1966, he resigned and became the president of the Motion Picture Association of America. During his tenure there, he was generally regarded as one of the most influential pro-copyright lobbyists in the world. His salary in 2004 was reported to be $1.35 million, which made him the seventh-highest paid Washington trade group chief, according to the National Journal.
- Mario Savio, (December 8, 1942 – November 6, 1996) American activist and a key member in the Berkeley Free Speech Movement. He is most famous for his passionate speeches, especially the "put your bodies upon the gears" address given at Sproul Hall, University of California, Berkeley on December 2, 1964. Savio remains historically relevant as an icon of the earliest phase of the 1960s counterculture movement. His father was born in Sicily (Santa Caterina Villarmosa).
- Andrew Cuomo, (born December 6, 1957) Democratic politician and the 56th Governor of New York from 2011 to 2021. He previously served as Attorney General of New York between 2007 and 2010, and United States Secretary of Housing and Urban Development between 1997 and 2001 under President Bill Clinton. He is of half-Sicilian ancestry through his mother, Matilda. His father, former New York Governor Mario Cuomo, was born to immigrants from Campania. He is the older brother of CNN journalist Chris Cuomo.

== Professors and scientists ==
- Pietro Bachi, (1787 – August 22, 1853) first professor from Italy teaching at Harvard University
- David J. Impastato, (January 8, 1903 – February 28, 1986) born in Mazara del Vallo, Sicily, he emigrated to the U.S. in 1912 and became one of the most distinguished psychiatrists of his day
- Philip Zimbardo, (born March 23, 1933, New York (South Bronx), NY) Professor Emeritus, Stanford University, psychologist.
- Anthony Fauci, (born December 24, 1940, New York Brooklyn, NY) former director of the National Institute of Allergy and Infectious Diseases and one of the leading figures of the White House Coronavirus Task Force for the COVID-19 pandemic in the United States

== Other ==
- Anthony Fantano, (born October 28, 1985), music critic
- Fran Fraschilla (born 1958), college basketball coach and ESPN basketball analyst.
