= Life's a Beach (disambiguation) =

Life's a Beach is a 2021 album by English band Easy Life.

Life's a Beach may also refer to:

- Life's a Beach, a 2012 film by Canadian director Tony Vitale
- Life Is a Beach, a 2012 album by German DJ Sash!

== See also ==
- Life's a Bitch (disambiguation)
