= Ira Deutchman =

American film producer (born 1953)

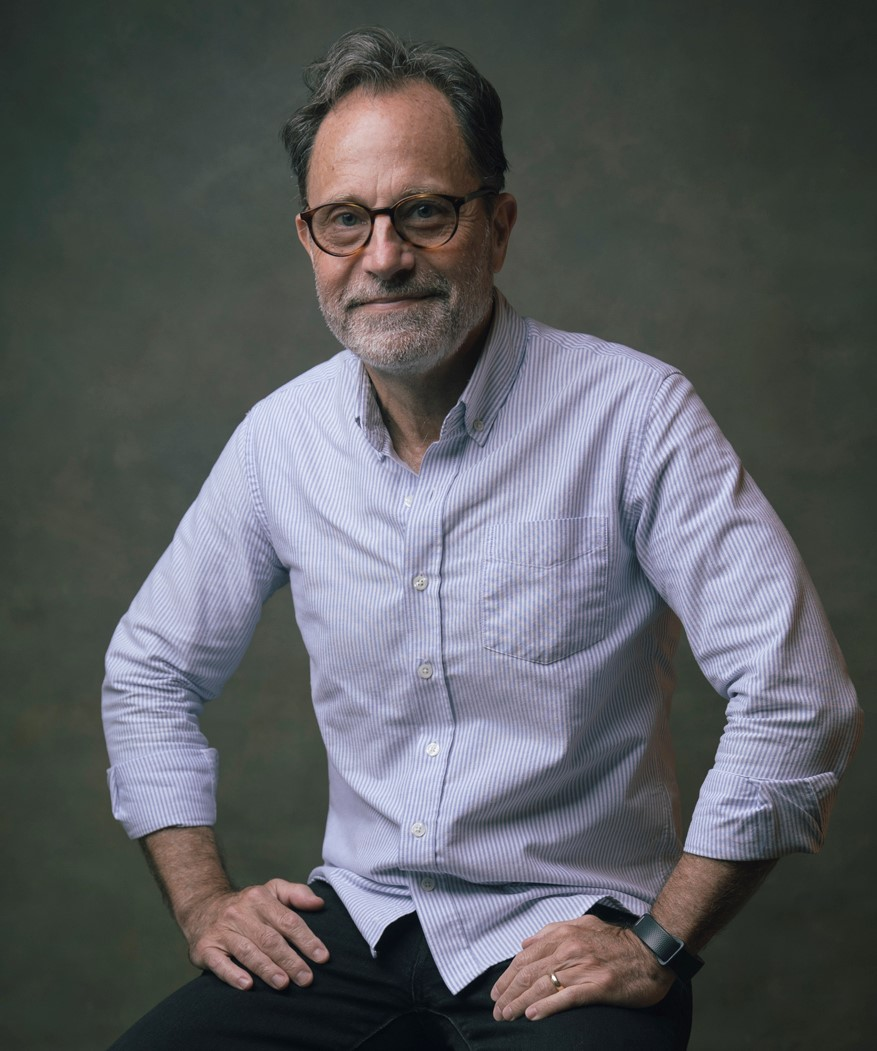
- Born: March 24, 1953 (age 73); Cherry Point, North Carolina
- Occupations: Independent producer, distributor, marketer
- Years active: 1975–present

Ira Deutchman is a producer, distributor and marketer of independent films. In 2000, he moved into film exhibition as co-founder and managing partner of Emerging Pictures, a New York-based digital exhibition company, which was sold in January 2015 to Vancouver-based 20 Year Media. He also served as Chair of the Film Program at Columbia University School of the Arts from 2011 to 2015, where he has been a Professor since 1987. Deutchman is a member of The Academy of Motion Picture Arts and Sciences. He was one of the original creative advisors to the Sundance Institute and formerly served on the board of advisors for the Sundance Film Festival. He has also served as a board member and former board chair for the Independent Feature Project, the board of advisors for the Los Angeles Independent Film Festival, the Williamstown Film Festival, IFP/West, and the Collective for Living Cinema, and was a member of the board for Kartemquin Films.

Deutchman continues to produce films, consults on the marketing and distribution of independent films and teaches producing students in the MFA Film Program at Columbia University's School of the Arts. Current projects include a film adaptation of Barbara Ehrenreich's best-selling book "Nickel and Dimed," a theatrical adaptation of Joan Micklin Silver's 1976 independent film "Hester Street" and a documentary about art film maverick Donald Rugoff, which premiered at the 2019 DOC NYC Festival in New York. He consults for Cinecitta on the marketing of Italian cinema in the United States. Deutchman was awarded the first annual Spotlight Lifetime Achievement Award at the 2017 Sundance Art House Convergence.

== Early life and education ==
Deutchman was born in Cherry Point, NC, on a military base, where his father was serving in the Marines. The family then moved to the Bronx. He spent his formative years on the south side of Chicago, graduating from the Myra Bradwell School in 1967. In his early teen years, his family moved briefly to Highland Park, a northern suburb of Chicago, before moving to New Jersey, where he graduated from Paramus High School. He returned to the Chicago area to attend Northwestern University, graduating in 1975 with a BS in speech, with a major in radio, TV, Film.

== Early career ==
While still in college at Northwestern University, Deutchman organized and marketed the Midwest premiere of John Cassavetes' A Woman Under the Influence. Shortly after graduation in 1975, Deutchman began his professional career, working under Don Rugoff at Cinema 5 Ltd., where he began in non-theatrical sales, moving into advertising before being named Director of Acquisitions. While there, he worked on the marketing of a number of high-profile art films such as "Scenes from a Marriage", "Monty Python and the Holy Grail", "Swept Away", "Harlan County USA" and "Pumping Iron".

Deutchman was one of the original founding team of United Artists Classics, where he worked as Director of Advertising and Publicity on such films as "Lili Marleen" (Rainer Werner Fassbinder), "Diva" (Jean-Jacques Beineix), "The Last Metro" (François Truffaut), "Lola" (Rainer Werner Fassbinder), and "Cutter's Way" (Ivan Passer), as well as the re-release of "New York, New York" (Martin Scorsese) and "The Last Waltz" (Martin Scorsese). From United Artists Classics, he moved on to become one of the founding partners for a number of distribution companies that made an impact on the independent film business, including Cinecom Pictures (originally called Cinecom International Films); Fine Line Features; and Redeemable Features.

At Cinecom Pictures (1982–1988), where Deutchman was co-founder and president, Deutchman released films including "A Room With a View," "Swimming to Cambodia", "El Norte", "The Brother from Another Planet" and "Stop Making Sense". After Cinecom, Deutchman formed Deutchman Company Inc. to act as a producers' rep and marketing consultant. The company worked on "Sex, Lies, and Videotape" (winner of the Palme d'Or at the Cannes Film Festival), "Metropolitan" and "To Sleep with Anger" among others.

While working as a consultant on Whit Stillman's "Metropolitan" for New Line Cinema, Deutchman was recruited to create a new specialized division of the company, which became Fine Line Features. Fine Line had an extraordinary five-year run from 1990 to 1995 under founder and president Ira Deutchman, distributing such critically acclaimed films as "Hoop Dreams", "The Player", "Short Cuts", "Night on Earth", "My Own Private Idaho", and "Mrs. Parker and the Vicious Circle".

Deutchman left Fine Line in 1995, to co-found independent film production company, Redeemable Features, with partners Peter Newman and Greg Johnson. Films included Tony Vitale's "Kiss Me, Guido", Sarah Kernochan's "All I Wanna Do", Adam Davidson's "Way Past Cool", and Tanya Wexler's "Ball in the House".

== Digital media and independent films ==
As co-founder of Emerging Pictures, Deutchman was an early promoter of digital film exhibition. In 2010, he launched "Movie Tweeviews," a curated, crowd-sourced 140-word film-review Twitter site that includes critics (e.g. Caryn James, Thelma Adams, Joe Leydon), curators, distributors, fans and filmmakers. Deutchman is a frequent speaker on the subject of digital film exhibition and marketing at U.S. and international conferences, including those hosted by Power to the Pixel, the Producers Guild of America, and the Motion Picture Association. He is also a regular speaker and moderator each year at U.S. and international film festivals, including the Cannes Film Festival, Toronto International Film Festival, SXSW, Guadalajara Film Festival, Traverse City Film Festival, Tribeca Film Festival, Sundance Film Festival, IFP Independent Film Week, San Francisco International Film Festival and the São Paulo International Film Festival. He has twice been a keynote speaker at the Art House Convergence annual conference, a conference of mission-driven art house theaters held every January in Midway Utah.

== Academic career ==
Deutchman began teaching at Columbia University in 1987 as an adjunct professor in the MFA Film Program of the School of the Arts. His first course in Marketing and Distribution of Feature Films has been taught continuously since, and is now called The Business of Motion Pictures. He became a full-time associate professor in 2000, and was promoted to full Professor in 2009. He was named Chair of the Film Program in July 2011 and served until 2015.

== Personal life ==
Deutchman is married and has two children. His son, Jeff Deutchman, is also in the film business; in 2013, after seven years at IFC Films, he moved to Paramount Pictures as Director of Acquisitions (Home Entertainment Division) and then in 2014 to Alchemy, where he served as VP of Acquisitions until 2016.; he is currently Senior Vice President of Acquisitions and Production for Neon; he is also the director/editor/producer of the documentary film "11-4-08", about Obama's presidential election. Deutchman's daughter, Emily Deutchman, is an artist and furniture maker, and his wife, Beth Krieger, was communications director at a New York City independent school until 2019.

== Archive donation ==
In 2015, Deutchman donated his extensive personal archives to the University of Michigan, which also includes the archives of Orson Welles, Robert Altman, John Sayles, Alan Rudolph and Nancy Savoca. Deutchman's collection includes over 40 years of documentation and artifacts of the independent film business from his time at Cinema 5 until the present.

== Searching for Mr. Rugoff ==
In 2019, Deutchman completed a feature documentary as both producer and director entitled Searching for Mr. Rugoff. The film premiered at DOC NYC in November 2019, and went on to play at the 2020 Palm Springs Film Festival, 2020 Cleveland Film Festival, 2020 Il Cinema Ritrovato Festival in Milan, Italy and the 2020 Mill Valley Film Festival among others. The film was received positively by critics, including Godfrey Cheshire of RogerEbert.com, who called it "A beautifully structured tale of movie love. “Searching for Mr. Rugoff” is both dramatic and enlightening, a moving document of an American life that has a bit of “Citizen Kane” to it. Nicolas Rapold in the New York Times called it "An essential history of film culture. I got the warm-and-fuzzies from seeing the love here for moviegoing." The film was released in theater in August, 2022 as a benefit for the re-opening of art house theaters after pandemic closures.

== Presentations and published works ==
=== Interviews and keynote speeches ===
- Keynote at the Filmmaker Bootcamp on YouTube, Toronto Int'l Film Festival, 2013
- , Keynote from the 2013 Art House Convergence
- Ira Deutchman: POV on Digital Cinema on YouTube, Technology Today, 2008
- Power to the Pixel: opening speech at the PTP Digital Distribution Forum for Independents on YouTube, 2008
- "Theatrical is Broken": Power to the Pixel conference on YouTube keynote at Power to the Pixel conference, 2007
- 2007 Interview: Ira Deutchman on Honeydripper and Indie Film Marketing

=== Articles and book chapters ===
- 2011: Indiewire: How to recreate the repertory cinema for the digital age
- 1992: The Movie Business Book, Chapter VIII: "Independent Distribution and Marketing"
- 1996: Moving Pictures, "So What's So Great About New York?"
- 1988: Variety, "In This Period of Product Glut, Indies Have Ace Up Their Sleeve"
- 1988: Daily Variety, "What it all Boils Down to is Showbiz"
- 1988: The Business of Film, "The Next 20 years: Ira Deutchman - USA Marketing/Distribution"
- 1986: The Film Journal, "State of the Art House"

== Filmography ==
=== As producer/director ===
- 2019 Searching for Mr. Rugoff

=== As producer ===
Director's name in brackets after film title.

- 1997: Kiss Me, Guido (Tony Vitale)
- 1998: "54" (Mark Christopher)
- 1999: "All I Wanna Do" aka "The Hairy Bird" (Sarah Kernochan)
- 2000: "Way Past Cool" (Adam Davidson)
- 2002: "Interstate 60" (Bob Gale)
- 2002: "Relative Evil" aka "Ball in the House" (Tanya Wexler)
- 2006: "Beauty Remains" (Ann Hu)
- 2007 "Speed of Life" (Ed Radtke)

=== As executive producer ===
Director's name in brackets after film title.

- 1987: "Swimming to Cambodia" (Jonathan Demme)
- 1988: "Miles from Home" (Gary Sinise)
- 1989: "Scenes from the Class Struggle in Beverly Hills" (Paul Bartel)
- 1991: "Straight Out of Brooklyn" (Matty Rich)
- 1992: "Waterland" (Stephen Gyllenhaal)
- 1993: "The Ballad of Little Jo" (Maggie Greenwald)
- 1994: "Mrs. Parker and the Vicious Circle" (Alan Rudolph)
- 1998: "Lulu on the Bridge" (Paul Auster)
- 2001: "Center of the World" (Wayne Wang)
- 2001: "Twelve" (Daniel Noah)
- 1998: "Killing Time" (Anthony Jaswinski)
- 2003: "The Lucky Ones" (Loren-Paul Caplin)
- 2005: "Red Doors" (Georgia Lee)
- 2008: "Brothel" (Amy Wadell)

Other Producer Credits: Associate Producer of John Sayles’ "Matewan" (1987) and "Honeydripper" (2007); Consulting Producer on the CBS sitcom "Some of My Best Friends" (2001).

=== Marketing and distribution ===
Films marketed and distributed by Deutchman include:

- 1976: "Harlan County USA" (Barbara Kopple)
- 1977: "Pumping Iron" (George Butler)
- 1980: "The Last Metro" (François Truffaut)
- 1981: "Lili Marleen" (Rainer Werner Fassbinder)
- 1982: "Diva" (Jean-Jacques Beineix)
- 1982: "Come Back to the Five and Dime, Jimmy Dean, Jimmy Dean" (Robert Altman)
- 1984: "The Brother From Another Planet" (John Sayles)
- 1984: "Stop Making Sense" (Jonathan Demme)
- 1985: "A Room with a View" (James Ivory)
- 1989: "Sex, Lies, and Videotape" (Steven Soderbergh)
- 1990: "Metropolitan" (Whit Stillman)
- 1991: "My Own Private Idaho" (Gus Van Sant)
- 1992: "The Player" (Robert Altman)
- 1993: "Short Cuts" (Robert Altman)
- 1994: "Hoop Dreams" (Steve James)
- 2006: "This Old Cub" (Jeff Santo)
- 2007: "Honeydripper" (John Sayles)
