= Home of the Brave (2004 film) =

- Directed by: Paola di Florio
- Written by: Paola di Florio
- Produced by: Paola di Florio; Nancy Dickenson
- Narrated by: Stockard Channing
- Edited by: Thomas G. Miller
- Music by: Karen Childs; David Powell
- Production company: Emerging Pictures
- Release date: 2004
- Running time: 75 minutes
- Country: United States
- Language: English

Home of the Brave is a 2004 documentary film about Viola Liuzzo, an American anti-racist activist during the Civil Rights Movement of the 1960s.

== Description ==
A white housewife and a mother of five children, Viola Liuzzo felt called to action by the words of Martin Luther King Jr., and she left her Michigan home to work in Alabama with the Southern Christian Leadership Conference in 1965. While she was serving as a volunteer during the historic Selma to Montgomery marches, Liuzzo was shot dead by members of the Ku Klux Klan. The film is a historical account of her life which is presented in the form of a montage which consists of archival footage, narrated by the actress Stockard Channing and it is laced with extensive interviews by Liuzzo's family members and contemporaries.

== Production ==
Home of the Brave was written, directed, and co-produced by Paola di Florio. The 75-minute film was released by Emerging Pictures in late 2004.

== Critical reception and review ==
Home of the Brave was nominated for the 2004 IDA Award by the International Documentary Association, and was selected for competition at that year's Sundance Festival.

It was nominated for Best Documentary Screenplay by the Writers Guild of America in 2005, and was one of the films featured at the first annual Traverse City Film Festival in 2005.

The New York Times praised di Florio's "poignant documentary" for depicting "the freshly outraging story of Liuzzo's death and of her difficult legacy to her children." Although the film highlighted familiar footage of marchers on the Edmund Pettus Bridge and of demonstrators in Birmingham being attacked with fire hoses, the Times said that it "distinguishes itself with touching film of Jim Liuzzo and his children being interviewed and of political leaders of the day."

On review aggregator website Rotten Tomatoes, the film holds an approval rating of 94% based on 16 reviews, with an average rating of 7.7/10.

== See also ==
- Civil rights movement in popular culture
