= All I Wanna Do (1998 film) =

1998 Canadian-American comedy film by Sarah Kernochan

- Theatrical release poster
- Directed by: Sarah Kernochan
- Written by: Sarah Kernochan
- Produced by: Ira Deutchman; Peter Newman
- Starring: Kirsten Dunst; Gaby Hoffmann; Lynn Redgrave; Rachael Leigh Cook; Thomas Guiry; Vincent Kartheiser; Monica Keena; Matthew Lawrence; Heather Matarazzo; Merritt Wever
- Cinematography: Anthony Janelli
- Edited by: Peter Frank
- Music by: Graeme Revell
- Production company: Redeemable Features
- Distributed by: Alliance Communications (Canada); Miramax Films (United States)
- Release date: August 21, 1998 (United States)
- Running time: 97 minutes
- Countries: Canada; United States
- Language: English
- Budget: $5 million
- Box office: $907,996

All I Wanna Do (originally titled The Hairy Bird, later Strike!) is a 1998 comedy film written and directed by Sarah Kernochan. It stars Kirsten Dunst, Gaby Hoffmann, Monica Keena, Heather Matarazzo and Rachael Leigh Cook in an ensemble cast as students of the fictional Miss Godard's Preparatory School for Girls, and Lynn Redgrave as the school's headmistress. The film takes place in 1963 and focuses on several students' plotting and sabotage of a proposed merger for the school to go coed.

Originally titled The Hairy Bird, the film's screenplay, set in 1963, is based loosely on Kernochan's experiences at Rosemary Hall around that time. Filming was done in Toronto, Ontario, Canada at the Trafalgar Castle School in Whitby. The song "The Hairy Bird" plays during the film's end credits; it was written by Kernochan and sung by a group which includes Kernochan and five of her Rosemary Hall classmates, including Glenn Close.

The film was given a limited release on September 4, 1998, in the United States under the title All I Wanna Do (as its American distributor Miramax Films found the original title too offensive), and was then acquired by Buena Vista Home Entertainment who released it straight-to-video. In Canada and the United Kingdom (as well as for later streaming distribution in the U.S.), it was released under the title Strike!

== Plot ==
In the winter of 1963 in New England, Odette "Odie" Sinclair is forcibly transferred by her parents to Miss Godard's Preparatory School for Girls after her parents find out that she has planned to have sex with her boyfriend, Dennis. Upon arrival at the school, which is run by the stern but kind headmistress Miss McVane, Odette is introduced to her roommates, the intelligent and charismatic Verena von Stefan and the promiscuous Tinka Parker. Verena and Tinka are the school's primary troublemakers; both mock an uptight hall monitor named Abigail "Abby" Sawyer, who has a penchant for tattletaling, and Verena regularly buys cigarettes from a lunch cook and is constantly late for classes.

After a brief hazing period, Odie is welcomed into the D.A.R. (Daughters of the American Ravioli), a secret club of several girls at the school who have greater aspirations than those of their peers; the members congregate in the school's attic, where they have access to canned ravioli stored above the cafeteria. The club is led by Verena, and consists of several other girls, including Theresa "Tweety" Goldberg, a bulimic who self-induces vomiting by drinking ipecac syrup and plans to be a child psychologist; and Maureen "Momo" Haines, a well-spoken science nerd and aspiring biologist. Verena has plans to start a fashion magazine like Vogue, while Tinka plans to be an "actress-folk singer-slut". Odie declares her interest in politics, but pines to finish what she started with Dennis and lose her virginity.

The D.A.R. begins planning a rendezvous for Odie and Dennis, but when it is discovered that Miss Godard's is considering going co-ed with the nearby St. Ambrose boys' academy, the girls become divided on the matter and ultimately the club breaks up, with Verena and Momo determined to sabotage an upcoming dance with the St. Ambrose boys. Meanwhile, the board of trustees for the school, which include Abby's parents, deliberates on the matter. Miss McVane detests the merger, but can do little about it because of the school's financial problems.

As the St. Ambrose dance arrives, Verena and Momo concoct a plan to cast the boys' academy in a bad light by spiking the fruit punch with alcohol from the chemistry lab and feeding them Tweety's ipecac to induce vomiting during their choir performance; Verena then plants empty liquor bottles in their school bus. The same night, Dennis arrives at the academy dressed in a St. Ambrose uniform and meets Odette for their rendezvous in the attic of the school. Just before they can consummate their relationship, Odette starts to have second thoughts when Dennis casually brushes off her interest in politics. They make up and begin kissing, but are caught by Mr. Dewey, a St. Ambrose teacher who acts lasciviously with students. Dewey throws Dennis out, but before he can make an advance on Odie, a group of teenage male townies called "The Flat Critters"—led by Snake who has a crush on Tinka—crash the scene, steal Dewey's clothes, and lock him in a closet.

Tweety and Tinka have a change of heart on the co-ed integration after Tweety is sexually assaulted and humiliated by some St. Ambrose students. With the help of the Flat Critters, they end up sending the intoxicated St. Ambrose boys home with a poor reputation. Mr. Dewey is also fired from the school. Miss McVane recognizes Verena as the mastermind behind the sabotage. Despite Miss McVane's appreciation for Verena's efforts, she is forced to expel Verena for having been caught fraternizing in her undergarments with a St. Ambrose boy.

The following week at the end of the year ceremony, the announcement of the merger is made by Mrs. Sawyer, much to the disapproval of the girls, including Abby. The students, led by Odie, hole up inside the school dormitories and demand a student body vote be counted as a single vote on the board of trustees. Meanwhile, a media circus surrounds the school, and the board of trustees agree to a student vote. Ultimately, the votes against the integration outnumber those for it, and the students donate their personal savings to help with the school's debt.

In an epilogue prior to the credits, the girls' fates are revealed:

Verena goes on to publish Moi, one of the most-read women's publications in the world;
Odette becomes a congresswoman and declares war on the tobacco industry;
Momo is a scientist developing the first male oral contraceptive;
Tinka, a famous actress, comes out to Barbara Walters in a 1997 interview;
Tweety became a psychologist and wrote a best-seller about bulimia;
Abby, a radical political activist, is serving a prison sentence for a 1970 bank holdup;
and Miss Godard's remains a girls school whose graduates include thousands of corporate and community leaders.

== Cast ==
- Kirsten Dunst as Verena von Stefan
- Gaby Hoffmann as Odette "Odie" Sinclair
- Lynn Redgrave as Miss McVane
- Rachael Leigh Cook as Abigail "Abby" Sawyer
- Tom Guiry as Bradley "Frosty" Frost
- Vincent Kartheiser as Snake (Flat Critter)
- Monica Keena as Tinka Parker
- Matthew Lawrence as Dennis
- Heather Matarazzo as Theresa "Tweety" Goldberg
- Merritt Wever as Maureen "Momo" Haines
- Robert Bockstael as Mr. Frank Dewey
- Brenda Devine as Miss Phipps
- Jenny Parsons as Mrs. Dewey
- Rosemary Dunsmore as Page Sawyer
- Nigel Bennett as Harvey Sawyer
- Dorothy Gordon as Mrs. O'Boyle
- Michael Reynolds as Mr. Armstrong
- Caterina Scorsone as Susie
- Michael Barry as Possum (Flat Critter)
- Zachary Bennett as Skunk (Flat Critter)
- Aaron Poole as Beagle (Flat Critter)
- Danny Smith as Groundhog (Flat Critter)
- Noah Shebib as Conrad Bateman
- Robin Dunne as Todd Winslow
- Paul Alexander Nolan as Charles Schumacher
- Hayden Christensen as Tinka's date
- Christopher Redmond as Danforth
- Shawn Ashmore as St. Ambrose photographer
- Jack Duffy as School Guard
- Richard McMillan as Bert Chubb (St. Ambrose Boy Housemaster)
- Les Porter as Graham John (St. Ambrose Boy Choirmaster)

== Production ==
All I Wanna Do was filmed between June 26 and August 19 of 1997 in Toronto and Whitby, Ontario, primarily at the Trafalgar Castle School also at Loretto Abbey Catholic Secondary School (especially the chapel scenes), and was financed through Canadian distribution company Alliance Communications (renamed around the time of release to Alliance Atlantis, following the completion of Alliance's merger with Atlantis Communications). Nora Ephron served as an executive producer. The film originally had the working title The Hairy Bird.

Toronto's Spin Productions was responsible for creating the opening hairy bird and film titles, rendered by animator Joe Sherman, with background graphics and design by Steven Lewis.

== Release ==
=== Box office ===
The film was picked up by Miramax Films for U.S. distribution for $3.5 million. Miramax insisted on retitling the film Strike! because they found the film's original working title, The Hairy Bird (which alluded to male genitalia), to be too offensive. It was given a test release on 13 screens in Seattle on August 21, 1998. Alliance released Strike on the same day in Canada on 133 screens, with the film grossing over $1.3 million. It was also released in the U.K. as Strike. On March 24, 2000, Miramax permitted the filmmakers to re-release the film in the U.S. under another title, All I Wanna Do. The film played for one week in New York at the United Artists Union Square and grossed $5383. It received enough critical attention that Disney Home Video released the film on VHS and DVD in 2000. On various digital distribution platforms, the film has different titles; on Amazon Prime Video, Google Play and YouTube in the United States (via some rights owned by FilmRise), the film is often listed as "Strike! (aka All I Wanna Do)", though with the U.S. title being used in the opening credits. Australia was the only country in which the film was released under its original title, The Hairy Bird.

In 2019, director Sarah Kernochan said Miramax co-chairman Harvey Weinstein intentionally shelved the film, an incident which is detailed in Peter Biskind’s book Down and Dirty Pictures: Miramax, Sundance, and the Rise of Independent Film. While Weinstein was initially enthusiastic about the film and told Kernochan it would screen in 2,000 theaters across the U.S.; Miramax ultimately buried the film.

=== Critical response ===
On Rotten Tomatoes, the film has a score of 67% based on 12 reviews. On Metacritic, it has a score of 60% based on reviews from 6 critics.

A. O. Scott of The New York Times noted that the film "mixes such prim old-fashioned naughtiness with more consequential misbehavior... All I Wanna Do lurches between girl-power melodrama and bratty farce, but the ungainliness is part of the film's charm." He also noted that the film is "surprisingly pleasant, thanks to smart, unstereotyped performances – especially by Ms. Hoffmann and Ms. Dunst – and the filmmaker's evident respect and affection for her characters." Writing for the Australian publication The Age, Tom Ryan deemed the film "an appealing slice of nostalgia for a time when the world seemed ready for the taking for those with enough spunk to try."

Nathan Rabin of The A.V. Club favorably reviewed the film, noting that in its final act it "gains focus and momentum, becoming less a nostalgic celebration of female bonding than a boldly feminist teen sex comedy that isn't above the occasional group-vomiting scene. It improves steadily as it goes along, right up through an enormously satisfying ending that combines rousing rhetoric about the price of gender inequity and the power of group solidarity—and throws in a rowdy snobs vs. slobs setpiece worthy of Animal House."

In Variety, Ken Eisner wrote, "Below the surface of this marketing headache lies a mildly effective coming-of-age saga that could speak to today's girls, and to Boomer survivors of the period depicted."
