= Honeydripper (film) =

- Theatrical release poster
- Directed by: John Sayles
- Screenplay by: John Sayles
- Produced by: Maggie Renzi
- Starring: Danny Glover; Keb' Mo'; Mable John; Kel Mitchell; Gary Clark Jr.
- Cinematography: Dick Pope
- Edited by: John Sayles
- Music by: Mason Daring
- Production companies: Anarchist's Convention Films; Honeydripper Films
- Distributed by: Emerging Pictures
- Release dates: September 10, 2007 (Toronto International Film Festival); December 28, 2007 (United States)
- Running time: 123 minutes
- Country: United States
- Language: English

Honeydripper is a 2007 American musical drama film written and directed by John Sayles.

== Plot ==
Filmed and set in Georgiana, Alabama circa 1950, the film stars Danny Glover as the owner of a traditional blues club that is failing and in danger of being taken over until he hires a young electric guitarist (Gary Clark, Jr.) to stand-in as the popular "Guitar Sam" in the hopes of attracting a younger crowd. The film also stars musician Keb' Mo' as a mysterious blind guitarist, actor/comedian Kel Mitchell and singer Mable John. Rhythm and blues singer Ruth Brown recorded some songs for the film and was cast to play the role ultimately played by John, but died before filming started. Many additional outdoor scenes and community scenes were filmed near Montgomery, Alabama at the Riverview Plantation including scenes using authentic sharecropper cabins from the period. The ending cabin scene was also filmed on location at Riverview with the backdrop of the Alabama River.

== Cast ==
- Danny Glover as Tyrone "Pine Top" Purvis
- Lisa Gay Hamilton as Delilah
- Yaya DaCosta as China Doll
- Charles S. Dutton as Maceo
- Vondie Curtis-Hall as "Slick"
- Gary Clark, Jr. as Sonny Blake
- Mable John as Bertha Mae
- Stacy Keach as Sheriff Pugh
- Nagee Clay as "Scratch"
- Absalom Adams as Lonnie
- Arthur Lee Williams as "Metalmouth" Sims
- Ruben Santiago-Hudson as Stokely
- Davenia McFadden as Nadine
- Daryl Edwards as "Shack" Thomas
- Sean Patrick Thomas as Dexter "Dex"
- Keb' Mo' as "Possum"
- Kel Mitchell as "Junebug"
- Mary Steenburgen as Amanda Winship

== Reception ==
=== Critical response ===
Stephen Holden, the film critic for The New York Times, was disappointed in the film script and wrote, "While operating on a mythic level Honeydripper also wants to create the same kind of top-to-bottom social microcosm found in many of Mr. Sayles’s films. But this time his attempt to have his characters be simultaneously symbolic and real works at cross purposes. He is so uncomfortable writing dialogue in an old-time Southern argot that the conversations in Honeydripper rarely settle into the easy, colorfully idiomatic flow that has always been a hallmark of Southern speech. Hard as they try to break through the stiffness, the film’s fine actors only fitfully succeed in camouflaging the machinery behind their characters."

John Anderson, film critic for Variety magazine, liked the film, and lauded the musical in his review. He wrote, "John Sayles the storyteller and John Sayles the political progressive haven't always played well together, but, in the endearing musical time-piece Honeydripper, the indie icon lets his narrative gifts take the lead and the social issues follow like a tight bass line. The result is one of Sayles' best films. The music, a mix of blues, seminal rock and newcomer Gary Clark Jr.'s performance, will be an obvious draw, as will the performances by some leading African-American actors."

Critic Kirk Honeycutt was uncomfortable with the stereotypes in the film but praised it due to Sayles' film background. He wrote, "...the film makes you at times uncomfortable with black and Southern stereotypes that may hinder some from fully enjoying an otherwise benign and cheerful tall tale of the Saturday night when rock came to rural Alabama. Sayles has paid far too many dues as a man who can write smoothly and in depth about many regions of America for a critical response to attack him over this. But the images and caricatures of a blind guitar picker, redneck sheriff, revival meetings, cotton-picking, fights in juke joints and the like have all been evoked in so many movies of much less integrity that this is a thing one must get past before surrendering to his amusing backwater fable.... The film does feature a host of interesting characters and, as always with Sayles, the dialogue has more than a few zingers. The well-cast actors are all solid, more than solid even, but as the director-editor Sayles lets the pace slacken too often."

Honeydripper won the 2008 NAACP Image Award for Outstanding Independent Motion Picture.

== Distribution ==
Honeydripper had its world premiere on September 10 at the 2007 Toronto International Film Festival. It also screened at the San Sebastián International Film Festival, the London Film Festival, the St. Louis International Film Festival and the San Joaquin Film Festival.

The film had a limited release in the United States on December 28, 2007, with a release in the United Kingdom set for April 28, 2008.
