= Alec Mapa: Baby Daddy =

- Directed by: Andrea James
- Written by: Alec Mapa
- Produced by: Jamison Hebert; Alec Mapa; Andrea James; Marc Cherry
- Starring: Alec Mapa
- Cinematography: Ian McGlocklin
- Edited by: Bryan Lukasic; Andrea James
- Music by: Marc Jackson
- Distributed by: Showtime
- Release date: March 15, 2014 (Los Angeles)
- Running time: 78 minutes (theatrical); 57 minutes (network)
- Country: United States
- Language: English

Alec Mapa: Baby Daddy is a 2013 one-man show by Alec Mapa. It was made into a concert film that screened at film festivals in 2014 and premiered on Showtime in 2015.

== Synopsis ==
The show begins with Mapa discussing his love of live theatre and his sex life. Mapa explains that he had a midlife crisis where he lost weight and went to gay clubs with younger men, putting stress on his marriage. He and his husband always wanted to have children, so they enrolled in foster care classes after Mapa performed during a cruise for R Family Vacations. They decided to adopt an older African American boy after learning that it was harder for African American boys to be adopted. Mapa describes funny and touching moments from being a new father. It ends with a slide show of the day his son Zion was adopted. The film includes behind-the scenes material at Mapa's home.

== Reception ==
The live performance premiered at the Laurie Beechman Theatre in Manhattan on February 9, 2012.

The play won the 2013 Bistro Award for Best Comedy Monology. It was also nominated for Outstanding New York Theatre: Off-Off Broadway at the 24th GLAAD Media Awards. Actor Ben Rimalower named it as one of ten solo shows that changed his life.

At the film's premiere, Mapa received the 2014 Fusion Achievement Award from Outfest. The film was also named one of the year's top ten LGBT documentaries by The Advocate.
