= Visible Vote '08: A Presidential Forum =

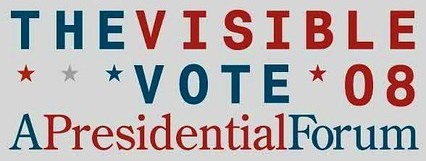
- Country of origin: United States
- Original language: English

Production
- Executive producers: Steven Fisher; Jim Fraenkel; Dave Mace
- Running time: 2 hours

Original release
- Network: Logo
- Release: August 9, 2007

The Visible Vote '08: A Presidential Forum aired live on August 9, 2007 on the TV channel Logo. It was the first-ever live televised forum with U.S. presidential candidates discussing solely LGBT-related issues. Logo co-sponsored the event, the first live one in its history, with the Human Rights Campaign.

== Format ==
Each candidate appeared on the program in the order in which they accepted the invitation from Logo and the Human Rights Campaign to participate. Three panelists posed questions to the candidates: Human Rights Campaign president Joe Solmonese, singer/songwriter Melissa Etheridge, and journalist Jonathan Capeheart. Margaret Carlson was moderator.

Issues discussed at the forum included same-sex marriage, civil unions, and domestic partnerships; "Don't Ask, Don't Tell"; employment discrimination based on sexual orientation; and HIV/AIDS.

== Attendees ==
Six of the eight top Democratic Party presidential candidates attended the forum: Senator Hillary Clinton (NY), Senator John Edwards (NC), former Senator Mike Gravel (AK), Representative Dennis Kucinich (OH), Senator Barack Obama (IL), and Governor Bill Richardson (NM). Senators Christopher Dodd (CT) and Joseph Biden (DE) could not attend due to scheduling conflicts.

Logo also invited Republican Party candidates, but they declined or did not respond to the invitation.

Several LGBT figures and allies attended the forum, including actress Jane Lynch; ex-Marine Staff Sergeant Eric Alva; comedian Alec Mapa; Noah's Arc’s Darryl Stephens, Doug Spearman, and Wilson Cruz; writer-director Nora Ephron; and actor Neil Patrick Harris.

== Highlights ==
Melissa Etheridge, one of the three panelists at the forum, asked Gov. Bill Richardson, "Do you think homosexuality is a choice or is it biological?" Richardson responded, "It's a choice." Etheridge restated the question: "Do you think a homosexual is born that way, or do you think that around seventh grade we go, 'Oh, I want to be gay'?" Richardson replied, "Well, I'm not a scientist."

Sen. Hillary Rodham Clinton faced scrutiny from gay advocates when she was asked by Joe Solmonese about her opposition to same-sex marriage. Clinton replied, "I prefer to think of it as being very positive about civil unions." Clinton stated she fully supported civil unions that would have the full equality and benefits of heterosexual marriage. Other views on same-sex marriage included Senator Barack Obama's statement that he would "make sure the legal rights that have consequences on a day-to-day basis for loving same-sex couples all across the country ... are recognized and enforced." Senator John Edwards renounced his previous statements that, due to his religious views and Southern Baptist background, he opposed same-sex marriage. Edwards stated "I shouldn’t have said that."

In contrast to the leading Democratic candidates' support for civil unions with all rights similar to marriage, only Representative Dennis Kucinich and former Senator Mike Gravel stated their support for same-sex marriage.

On gays in the military, Senator Clinton claimed that the creation of the "Don’t Ask, Don't Tell" policy in the administration of her husband, former President Bill Clinton, was initially meant to prevent a "witch hunt" for gays and lesbians in the military.
