= Anthony Barrile =

American actor

- Born: Brooklyn, New York
- Occupations: Actor; writer; film director

Anthony Barrile is a United States actor, musician, writer, and director. He is a native New Yorker of Italian descent who has starred in many film and stage productions. He is well known to New York City audiences for his memorable performance as Cousin Kevin, the twisted lout in the original Broadway production of the Tony Award winning The Who's Tommy, and can be heard on its original cast recording. He also appeared in the acclaimed Off-Broadway production of End of the World Party, among his other New York stage credits.

Barrile is well known to cinema audiences for his role as Vinnie Manalo in the 1985 horror film Friday the 13th: A New Beginning, and as Vincent "Alphabet" Languilli in the 1987 Vietnam War movie Hamburger Hill, as well as his favorite film appearance: Warren in Kiss Me, Guido. Barrile has made numerous guest appearances on television, including turns on Miami Vice, Law & Order, and Falcone. He also appeared in Paula Abdul's music video of "Rush Rush".

Barrile is currently continuing work on a screenplay about life, love and theatre, with co-screenwriter Geoffrey Nauffts. That work has been presented in several readings in both New York and Los Angeles, to wide acclaim. It is to be produced by Red Hour Films, in association with Ted Hope's This is That Productions (Eternal Sunshine of the Spotless Mind, In the Bedroom, 21 Grams)

Barrile is originally from Brooklyn, New York and is the nephew of Leo Barrile. He is close friends with Ben Stiller and Bobby Cannavale.

== Filmography ==
Year	Title	Role	Notes
1985	Friday the 13th: A New Beginning	Vinnie Manalo	
1987	Hamburger Hill	Pvt. Vincent 'Alphabet' Languilli	
1990	Girlfriend from Hell	Carl	
1992	Sinatra	Bart Barbato	2 episodes
1997	Kiss Me, Guido	Warren	
1998	Bury the Evidence	The Dresser	
2003	Chooch	Anthony Rubino	
2015	Miami or Bust: A Hoboken Bet	Little Joe	
