= One Last Ride (film) =

- Directed by: Tony Vitale
- Written by: Patrick Cupo
- Based on: One Last Ride by Patrick Cupo
- Produced by: Christian Arnold-Beutel; John J. Kelly; Patrick Cupo
- Starring: Patrick Cupo; Chazz Palminteri; Robert Davi; Charles Durning; Anita Barone
- Cinematography: Mark Doering-Powell
- Edited by: Gregory Hobson
- Music by: Josh G. Abrahams
- Release date: April 5, 2004 (Method Fest)
- Running time: 88 minutes
- Country: United States
- Languages: English; Italian

One Last Ride is a 2004 American drama film directed by Tony Vitale and starring Patrick Cupo, Chazz Palminteri, Robert Davi, Charles Durning and Anita Barone. It is based on Cupo's play of the same name and Ang Lee served as an executive producer of the film.

== Cast ==
- Patrick Cupo as Michael
- Chazz Palminteri as Tweat
- Robert Davi as Michael's Father
- Anita Barone as Gina
- Jack Carter as Sid
- Joe Marinelli as Carmine
- Mario Roccuzzo as Charlie Figs
- Tracey Walter as Nicky
- Tony Lee as Richie
- Charles Durning as Orlick

== Production ==
Filming began in Los Angeles on January 25, 2003.

== Release ==
The film premiered at the Method Fest Independent Film Festival on April 5, 2004.

== Reception ==
Robert Koehler of Variety gave the film a positive review and wrote, "The potent cast, Tony Vitale’s assured direction and a solid foundation with lead thesp Patrick Cupo adapting his own play help mitigate many of the pic’s deficiencies..."
