= Nick Scotti =

American actor, model and singer (born 1966)

- Born: Domenico Nicola Aniello Scotti
- Occupations: Actor; model; singer

Domenico Nicola Aniello Scotti is an American former actor, model and singer.

Scotti left high school to travel the world for a career in modeling, moving to Japan at age 17 and France at age 19. In the process, he became a popular male model. He appeared on the cover of Newsweek in June 1996 with a heading that read, "Biology of Beauty".

His self-titled debut album, released in 1993 on Reprise Records, contains two songs that reached the Billboard Hot Dance Club Play chart. The first, "Wake Up Everybody", was a cover version of a hit song by Harold Melvin & the Blue Notes from 1976. It reached No. 9 on the Club Play chart in May of that year and remained on the chart for eleven weeks. The follow-up single, "Get Over", was written by Madonna and Stephen Bray and produced by Madonna and Shep Pettibone. "Get Over" peaked at No. 33 on the Club Play chart.

From 1996 through 1999, Scotti had a contract role on the CBS soap opera The Young and the Restless, where he portrayed an auto mechanic named Tony Viscardi. In 1997, he starred in the independent film Kiss Me, Guido, which was directed by Tony Vitale. For his role in that film, he received a Leonardo da Vinci Award from the Beaux Arts Society, Inc. in the category of Actor, Debut Performance (Film) in 1997. Other film credits include Bullet (1996) and Detroit Rock City (1999).

Scotti appeared in episodes of the television programs Sex and the City and Tracey Takes On.... In 2004, he hosted a cooking, fashion, and lifestyle show on the Style Network titled New York Nick.

== Actor ==
- 2006: The Last Request - Tom
- 2005: Perception - Jason
- 2002: Sex and the City (TV series) - Joe, Worldwide Express Guy – Cover Girl
- 1999: Detroit Rock City - Kenny
- 1996: The Young and the Restless (TV series) Tony Viscardi (1996–1999)
- 1998: Tracey Takes On... (TV series) - Johnno – Smoking (1998)
- 1997: Kiss Me, Guido - Frankie
- 1996: Bullet - Young Boy No. 2 – Philly

== Music ==
- 1993: Nick Scotti (album)
