= Kiss Me, Guido =

1997 US independent comedy film by Tony Vitale

- Theatrical release poster
- Directed by: Tony Vitale
- Written by: Tony Vitale
- Produced by: Ira Deutchman; Christine Vachon
- Starring: Nick Scotti; Anthony Barrile; Anthony DeSando; Craig Chester
- Cinematography: Claudia Raschke
- Edited by: Alexander Hall
- Music by: Stewart Copeland
- Production companies: Kardana Films; Capitol Films; Redeemable Features
- Distributed by: Paramount Pictures
- Release date: July 18, 1997
- Running time: 86 minutes
- Country: United States
- Language: English
- Budget: $740,000
- Box office: $1,918,497

Kiss Me, Guido is a 1997 independent comedy film. Written and directed by Tony Vitale (a former location manager) and produced by Ira Deutchman and Christine Vachon, it stars Nick Scotti, Anthony Barrile, Anthony DeSando and Craig Chester.

== Synopsis ==
Frankie (Scotti) is a young Italian American man living with his family in The Bronx, New York. He works in a pizza parlor but, inspired by the likes of Al Pacino and Robert De Niro, he wants to be an actor. After catching his fiancée (Jennifer Esposito) cheating on him with his brother, Frankie decides the time has come to move out and pursue his dream.

He starts by checking the classifieds for roommate ads. He finds an ad from a "GWM". In classified-speak this stands for "gay white male" but Frankie and his friend Joey (Domenick Lombardozzi) interpret it as "guy with money."

The GWM in question is Warren (Barrile), an actor who has recently broken up with his director boyfriend. Frankie and Warren each have some initial misgivings – Frankie over Warren's being gay, Warren over Frankie's being a "Guido" or stereotypical Italian American – but Warren lets Frankie move in.

Warren's ex, Dakota (Christopher Lawford), returns and offers Warren a part in his new play. Warren initially accepts but after being injured in an attempted gay bashing, has to withdraw. Frankie replaces him, but the part involves a same-sex kiss, which makes him nervous. At the premiere Frankie gives a good performance (although he hesitates on the kiss, leading his scene partner to hiss "Kiss me, Guido!") for an audience that includes his family, who come to understand and accept his decision to become an actor.

== Cast ==
- Nick Scotti as Frankie
- Anthony Barrile as Warren
- Anthony DeSando as Pino
- Craig Chester as Terry
- Domenick Lombardozzi as Joey Chips
- Molly Price as Meryl
- Christopher Lawford as Dakota
- David Deblinger as Stage Actor
- John Tormey as Patsy Zito
- Antonia Rey as Josephina Zito
- Jennifer Esposito as Debbie
- Anthony Vitale as Pizza Guy #1
- Frankie Dellarosa as Pizza Guy #2
- Rebecca Waxman as Wiggy
- Tony Ray Rossi as Vinny the Fish

== Soundtrack ==
- Machine – "There But for the Grace of God Go I"
- Panic Patrol – "Out of Control"
- La Flavour – "Mandolay"
- Miquel Brown – "So Many Men, So Little Time"
- 3rd Party – "Can U Feel It"
- Edwin Starr – "Contact"
- Carol Jiani – "Hit & Run Lover"
- Martha Wash – "Magic Charms"
- The Gap Band – "Burn Rubber on Me (Why You Wanna Hurt Me)"
- Nick Scotti – "I'm Gonna Shout"
- Edwin Starr – "H.A.P.P.Y. Radio"
- Gloria Gaynor – "I Am What I Am"
- Love Tribe – "Stand Up"

== Reviews ==
On the review aggregator website Rotten Tomatoes, 33% of 15 critics' reviews are positive.

In 1997, Janet Maslin of The New York Times wrote of the film "amusing high-concept notion of sending a Bronx heterosexual into the midst of gay Manhattan and watching the fur fly" and it (the film) "has an appealing indie flavor".

== Television ==
CBS brought Kiss Me, Guido to the small screen in 2001 under the title Some of My Best Friends. The series starred Jason Bateman as Warren, Danny Nucci as Frankie, Michael DeLuise as Pino and openly gay actor Alec Mapa in the newly created role of Vern Limoso. The series, written by Tony Vitale and Marc Cherry of Desperate Housewives, was cancelled after one season.
