= Very Mean Men =

- Directed by: Tony Vitale
- Written by: Paul T. Murray
- Produced by: Tony Cataldo; Lydia Dadon
- Starring: Matthew Modine; Ben Gazzara; Martin Landau; Scott Baio; Burt Young; Paul Ben-Victor
- Cinematography: Alex Vendler
- Edited by: Gregory Hobson
- Music by: Ennio Di Berardo
- Release date: June 10, 2000
- Country: United States
- Language: English

Very Mean Men is a 2000 American crime-comedy film directed by Tony Vitale and starring Matthew Modine, Ben Gazzara, Martin Landau, Scott Baio, Burt Young, and Paul Ben-Victor.

== Cast ==
- Matthew Modine as Bartender
- Ben Gazzara as Gino Minetti
- Martin Landau as Mr. White
- Scott Baio as Paulie Minetti
- Burt Young as Dominic Piazza
- Paul Ben-Victor as Jimmy D.
- Billy Drago as Dante
- Charles Durning as Paddy Mulroney
- Louise Fletcher as Katherine Mulroney
- Jack McGee as Jocko Mulroney
- Patrick Renna as Donny Mulroney
- Idalis DeLeón as Argentine
- Leigh-Allyn Baker as Mary
- Charles Napier as Detective Bailey
- Joe Lara as Detective Miller
- Lana Parrilla as Teresa
- Tony Vitale as Night Bartender

== Release ==
The film entered the competition at the 2000 Seattle International Film Festival, in which it won the New American Cinema Award for best editing.
