= Marco Rafalà =

Sicilian American novelist

- Born: Middletown, Connecticut, United States
- Occupations: Novelist & Game Writer
- Notable work: How Fires End

Marco Rafalà is an American novelist, and writer for tabletop role-playing games.

== Education ==
Born in Middletown, Connecticut, he earned a Bachelor of Arts (B.A.) in English literature from Albertus Magnus College and a Master of Fine Arts (M.F.A.) in Creative Writing from The New School.

== Career ==
Marco Rafalà's award-winning debut novel How Fires End was published in October 2019 by Little A. Formerly a musician, Rafalà spent the 1990s recording and touring with various indie bands until he accompanied his father on a trip to Melilli, Sicily, his father's birthplace. He spent the next ten years writing what would become his first novel, taking inspiration from his time in Sicily and the stories his father told him about growing up during and after the Second World War.

On October 15, 2019, How Fires End, the debut novel by Marco Rafalà, was officially introduced during a book launch event held at Ferrara Bakery & Cafe in New York City. The occasion featured a discussion with novelist, poet, and translator Idra Novey, moderated by poet and editor Hafizah Geter, along with musical performances by Solo Di Gondolieri. Rafalà also appeared at the Wesleyan RJ Julia Booksellers in Middletown, Connecticut, with novelist, Juliet Grames (The Seven or Eight Deaths of Stella Fortuna), in 2019 to discuss his novel and its ties to the Italian American immigrant community there. Other book tour events included the fifth installment of New Haven's "Songs and Stories," on December 28, 2019, the 2020 Bazaar Writers Salon in San Francisco, the Argenta Reading Series in North Little Rock, Arkansas, At the Inkwell in Denver, Colorado, and a discussion at Village Books in Bellingham, Washington, with Rena Priest (Poet Laureate of Washington State, 2021–2023).

Rafalà has also written for many leading tabletop roleplaying games, including Star Trek Adventures, The One Ring Roleplaying Game, Lex Arcana, and Beowulf: Age of Heroes.

== Awards and honorable mentions for How Fires End ==
- Named a best book of 2019 by Writer's Bone
- Named a best book of 2020 by The Brooklyn Rail
- Winner of the 2020 Best Book Awards in Literary Fiction at the American Book Festival
- A 2020 Connecticut Book Awards finalist and honorable mention
- Winner of the 2021 Italian American Studies Association Book Award

== Works ==
=== Novels ===
- How Fires End, Little A, 2019

=== Short fiction ===
- “Tenebre”, Bellevue Literary Review, Volume 1, Number 1, Fall 2001

=== Essays ===
- “When a Family Measures Time by its Losses,” Literary Hub, November 6, 2019,
- “How a Trip to My Father’s Village in Sicily Inspired a Novel That Took Ten Years to Write,” Italian America, Vol XXV, No.2, Spring 2020

=== Games ===
The One Ring Roleplaying Game — An award-winning tabletop game based on the novels by J. R. R. Tolkien and published by Cubicle 7 Entertainment.

- “What Lies Beneath,” written with Richard Harrison for Ruins of the North
- Journeys & Maps, Contributing Author
- Adventurer’s Companion, Contributing Author

Star Trek Adventures — an award-winning tabletop roleplaying game published by Modiphius Entertainment.

- “A World With A Bluer Sun” for These Are The Voyages, Mission Compendium I
- “Plato’s Cave” for Strange New Worlds, Mission Compendium II
- Alpha Quadrant Sourcebook, Contributing Author
- “A Forest Apart,” a standalone PDF adventure
- “A Star Beyond the Stars,” an introductory campaign for the Star Trek Adventures Starter Set

Lex Arcana — a historical-fantasy roleplaying game set in a world where the Roman Empire never fell. Published by Quality Games.

- “Eye of the Cyclops” for Mysteries of the Empire

Beowulf: Age of Heroes — a critically acclaimed tabletop roleplaying game setting based on one of the oldest recorded stories in Western Europe. Published by Handiwork Games.

- Horror at Herrogate

Forts & Frontiers — a historical roleplaying game set in 17th and 18th century North America, based on the D&D 5E rules set. Published by Campaign Games.

- The Feast of the Dead, a starter scenario written with Jameson Proctor, written for Free RPG Day 2019.

=== Film appearances ===
- Shooting at the Moon (1998, re-edited 2003), Directed by Jesse Richards and Nicholas Watson, as Speaking Man
