= Alec Mapa =

American actor, comedian and writer

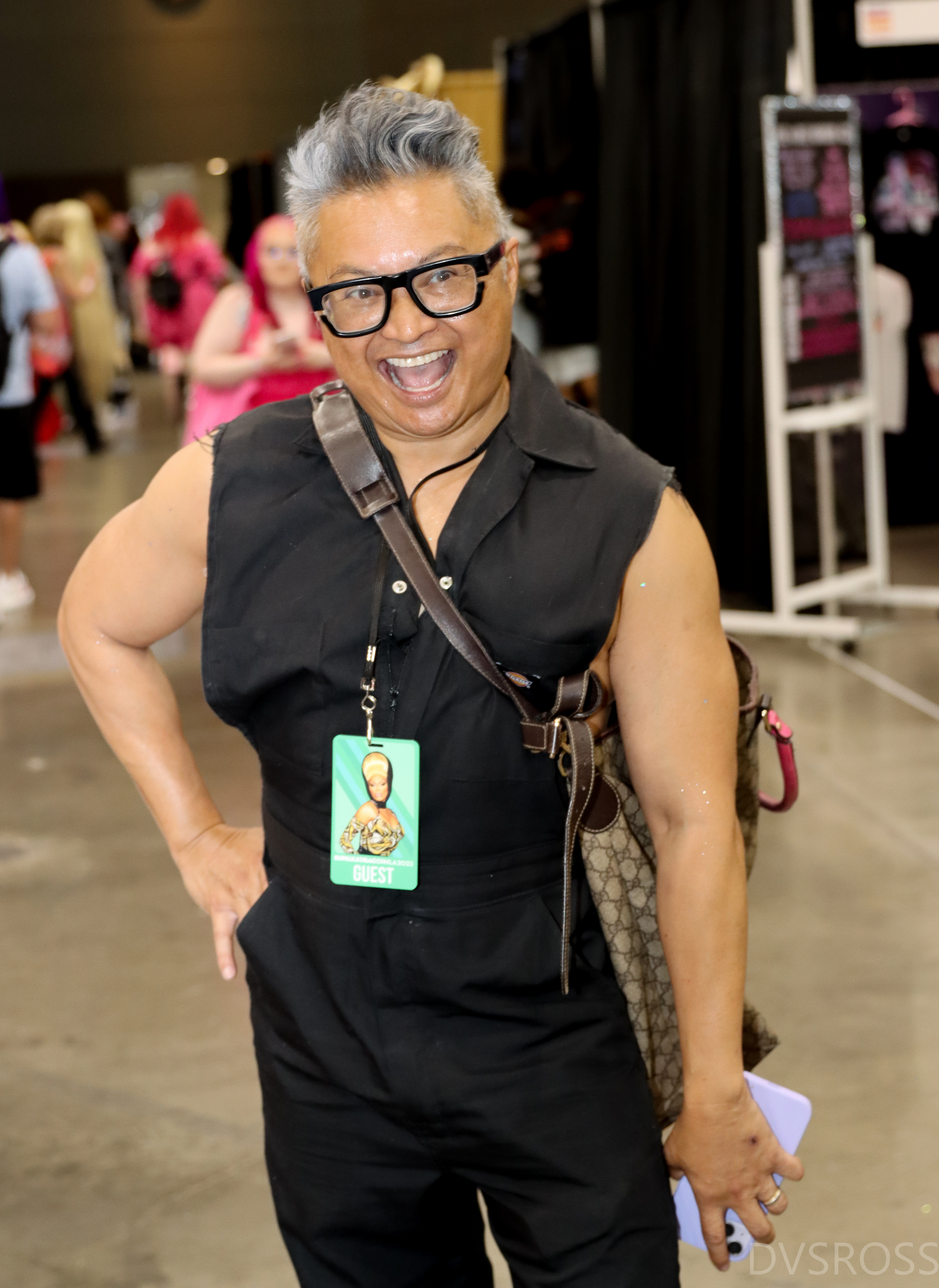
- Mapa at DragCon in 2023
- Born: Alejandro Mapa; July 10, 1965 (age 60); San Francisco, California, U.S.
- Occupations: Actor; comedian; writer
- Years active: 1987–present
- Spouse: Jamison Hebert (m. 2008)
- Children: 1
- Website: www.alecmapa.com

Alejandro "Alec" Mapa (/ˈmɑːpə/; born July 10, 1965) is an American actor, comedian and writer. He got his first professional break when he was cast to replace B. D. Wong for the role of Song Liling in the Broadway production of M. Butterfly. He gained recognition for roles such as Adam Benet on Half & Half, Suzuki St. Pierre on Ugly Betty and Vern on Desperate Housewives. Mapa recurred as Renzo on Switched at Birth.

Mapa co-hosted the Logo network reality dating game show Transamerican Love Story with Calpernia Addams in 2008. In 2013, he debuted in his own one-man show, Alec Mapa: Baby Daddy, which was made into a concert film and premiered on Showtime in 2015.

== Early life ==
Mapa was born in San Francisco and attended George Washington High School. While in high school, he played Randolph McAfee in the production of Bye Bye Birdie.

Mapa's senior year productions were Cabaret and Harvey, both in which he had the lead roles. Mapa was also a champion orator in the Humorous and Dramatic Interpretation categories of Speech.

== Career ==
Mapa got his professional break when he was cast to understudy, and then replace B. D. Wong in the Broadway production of M. Butterfly. Mapa later played the role on the national tour. Mapa would return to Broadway in an adaptation of L'Hôtel du libre échange by Georges Feydeau and Maurice Desvallières, re-titled, "A Little Hotel on the Side" in 1992. The next year, Mapa was back on Broadway in a Stratford Festival inspired production of Timon of Athens. Off-Broadway, Mapa earned a nomination at the 2001 Lucille Lortel Awards for his performance in the Jessica Hagedorn play Dogeaters, and was featured in every play in the "Whitelands" trilogy, a series of plays about gay Asian men written by Chay Yew; "Porcelain" (1992), "A Language of Their Own" (1995), and "Wonderland" (1999).

On television, he has made guest appearances on a wide variety of programs, including The Jamie Foxx Show, Roseanne, Seinfeld, NYPD Blue, Friends, Murder One and Dharma & Greg. He had a supporting role in the short-lived 2001 comedy Some of My Best Friends. He played Adam Benet in the UPN comedy Half & Half.

He wrote and performed in a one-man play titled "I Remember Mapa", about his experiences growing up gay in San Francisco.

Mapa was a featured performer on the Logo original stand-up comedy series Wisecrack. In 2006 appeared as Vern, Gabrielle's personal shopper, on the TV series Desperate Housewives. He had a recurring role on the 2006–2010 series Ugly Betty, as Suzuki St. Pierre, the flamboyant host of a fictional gossip and news show (who, it is revealed, is actually a straight—and married—journalist named Byron Wu). He performed the voice of Rick's flamboyantly gay uncle Bakla on the 2007-2009 animated series Rick & Steve: The Happiest Gay Couple in All the World.

Mapa's film credits include parts in Bright Lights, Big City, Playing by Heart, Connie and Carla and Marley & Me, among others. He was featured in the movies Super Sweet 16: The Movie and Tru Loved. He also played a hairstylist in the movie You Don't Mess with the Zohan.

In 2008, Mapa hosted Logo's Transamerican Love Story, a reality dating program starring transgender woman Calpernia Addams selecting from among eight potential suitors. In the same year, he also hosted Dancing With Dogs on Animal Planet.

Mapa also performed on the 2009 Atlantis Freedom Caribbean Cruise headlining in the Arcadia Theater.

In 2010, Mapa became one of the co-hosts of Logo's The Gossip Queens, a daily series where he helps present celebrity gossip.

In his act, he jokes that he is sometimes confused with Rex Lee, another flamboyant Asian gay man who plays Lloyd on the HBO dramedy Entourage.

In 2015, Mapa appeared on Candidly Nicole with Nicole Richie.

Mapa has appeared in various iterations of the reality competition series RuPaul's Drag Race and its spin-off shows. He first appeared in 2010 as a guest judge on the second season for the first ever Snatch Game challenge. In 2011 he appeared as a guest judge on the second season of the spin-off series RuPaul's Drag U for the Suddenly Single challenge. In 2013 he performed in drag as a warm-up act for the live finale of the show's fifth season. He returned in 2021 as a special guest for the Charisma, Uniqueness, Nerve and Talent Monologues challenge on the sixth season of RuPaul's Drag Race All Stars. His next appearance was in 2022 as a guest judge for the "60s Girl Groups" episode on the fourteenth season of RuPaul's Drag Race. The same year Mapa began hosting, alongside comedian Loni Love, the official RuPaul's Drag Race podcast, Squirrel Friends, in collaboration with iHeartRadio. For a brief period in 2021 he had previously hosted a previous iteration of the podcast, simply entitled The Official RuPaul's Drag Race Podcast, alongside Canada's Drag Race season 1 winner Priyanka. His most recent appearance was in 2023 as a special guest for the Carson Kressley, This is Your Gay Life challenge on the eighth season of RuPaul's Drag Race All Stars.

In 2023, Mapa appeared in the Lifetime original film, Ladies of the '80s: A Divas Christmas, starring Loni Anderson, Morgan Fairchild, Linda Gray, Donna Mills, and Nicollette Sheridan.

== Personal life ==
Mapa is gay and lends his support to various projects supporting the gay, lesbian, and Asian American communities. In 2008, Mapa legally married Jamison "Jamie" Hebert, after dating since 2002. On the TV series The Gossip Queens, Mapa stated in the opening episode that he and his husband had adopted a 5-year-old boy in 2010.

== Credits ==
=== Writer ===
- Half & Half (2006): "The Big Nervous Breakup Episode"

=== Filmography ===
Film roles
Year	Title	Role	Notes
1988	Bright Lights, Big City	Yasu Wade	
1988	A New Life	Sybil	
1996	The Substance of Fire	New Receptionist	
1998	Playing by Heart	Lana	
2003	Who's Your Daddy?	Nat-San Wang	
2004	Connie and Carla	Lee / N'Cream	
2005	Hard Pill	Protester	
2005	Pollen	Howard	12 minutes
2006	Dirty Laundry	Daniel	
2008	Marley & Me	Jorge	
2008	Tru Loved	Mr. Bushnell	
2008	You Don't Mess with the Zohan	Claude	
2008	Laughing Matters... The Men	Himself	stand-up comedy; ASIN B0010P5UOU
2011	Going Down in LA-LA Land	Himself	
2011	Half-Share	Ito	Short Film (29 minutes)
2011	Sharpay's Fabulous Adventure	Gill Samms	
2011	Winner Takes All	Simon	Short Film (15 minutes); included in the compilation film Black Briefs (2012)
2012	Family Restaurant	Daddy	Short Film (10 minutes)
2014	Alec Mapa: Baby Daddy	Himself	concert film of one-man show
2014	Such Good People	Jigme Wanchuck	
2017	A Very Sordid Wedding	Marty Wells	
2017	The Year of Spectacular Men	Overzealous Casting Director	
2019	Grand-Daddy Day Care	Ned Tooley	
2020	Chick Fight	Chuck	
2021	Queen Bees	Lito Santos	
2023	Ladies of the '80s: A Divas Christmas	Jeffrey	

Television roles
Year	Title	Role	Notes
1987	ABC Afterschool Special	Peng	Episode: "Supermom's Daughter"
1990	The Cosby Show	Wretched Fan	Episode: "Off to See the Wretched"
1992	Flying Blind	Lucas	Episode: "The Secret of My Great Dress"
1992	Melrose Place	Jeweler No. 2	Episode: "The Whole Truth"
1993	Key West		Episode: "The Second Day in Heaven"
1993	The Young Indiana Jones Chronicles	Nguyen	Episode: "Paris, May 1919"
1994	Hart to Hart: Crimes of the Hart	Hal Trask	
1994	Roseanne	Kyle	Episode: "Skeleton in the Closet"
1995	Hangin' with Mr. Cooper	Perry	Episode: "Halloween"
1995	Law & Order	Brian Yoshimara	Episode: "Rebels"
1995	M.A.N.T.I.S.	Troy	Episode: "The Sea Wasp"
1995	Seinfeld	Paul	Episode: "The Pool Guy"
1996	The Jamie Foxx Show	Ike Yee	Episode: "A Star Is Almost Born"
1996	NYPD Blue	Angela	Episode: "Unembraceable You"
1997	Murder One	Damien Vasquez	Episodes: "Chapter Seventeen, Year Two" and "Chapter Eighteen, Year Two"
1997	Murder One: Diary of a Serial Killer	Damien Vasquez	TV miniseries
1997	Nick Freno: Licensed Teacher	Sammy Choi	Episode: "Party at Nick's Place"
1997	NYPD Blue	Angela	Episode: "I Love Lucy"
1997	Spy Game	Andy Shawn	Episodes: "With Friends Like These..." and "Well, Nothing to Fear But Death Itself"
1998	Friends	The Housekeeper	Episode: "The One with All the Thanksgivings"
1998	Holding the Baby	Nelson	Episode: "No Man Is a Fantasy Island"
1999	Dharma & Greg	Trina	Episode: "Welcome to the Hotel Calamari"
2001	Some of My Best Friends	Vern Limoso	8 episodes
2002	Baby Bob	Brian	Episode: "House of the Rising Son"
2002–2005	Half & Half	Adam Benet	58 episodes
2003	Alias	NSC Techie	Episode: "The Nemesis"
2004	E! 101 Most Awesome Moments in Entertainment	Himself	Special
2004	I'm with Her	Henry Liu	Episode: "Not in My Dress You Won't"
2004	Significant Others	Parent No. 1	Episode: "A School, Not Cool & a Fool"
2005–2007	Desperate Housewives	Vern	5 episodes
2005	Wisecrack	Himself	stand-up comedy
2006	Help Me Help You	Andrew	Episode: "Inger Management"
2007	Heartland	Teddy DeSilva	Episode: "A Beautiful Day"
2007–2010	Ugly Betty	Suzuki St. Pierre	30 episodes
2007	The Visible Vote '08: A Presidential Forum	Himself	
2008	Celebracadabra	Pilot Contestant	
2008	Dancing with Dogs	Himself (Host)	
2008	Transamerican Love Story	Himself (Host)	8 episodes
2009	Alec Mapa: No Fats, Femmes or Asians	Himself	stand-up comedy special
2009	Annul Victory	Himself	Documentary
2009	Numbers	Clerk	Episode: "Old Soldiers"
2009	Rick & Steve: The Happiest Gay Couple in All the World	Uncle Bakla (voice)	Episodes: "House of Race Cards" and "Marry X-Mas"
2010	2010 NewNowNext Awards	Himself	
2010–2011	The Gossip Queens	Himself (Host)	68 episodes
2010	Jonas	Chef Shiraki	Episode: "A Wasabi Story"
2010	Pride: The Gay & Lesbian Comedy Slam	Himself	stand-up comedy special
2010, 2022	RuPaul's Drag Race	Himself	2 episodes
2010	The View	Himself	2 episodes
2011	Rules of Engagement	Restaurant Manager	Episode: "The Power Couple"
2011	RuPaul's Drag U	Himself (Guest Judge)	"Suddenly Single"
2012	Scandalicious	Himself (Presenter)	4 episodes
2014	Switched at Birth	Renzo	8 episodes
2014	Hey Qween!	Himself (guest)	1 episode
2015	Major Crimes	Nurse	Episode: "The Jumping Off Point"
2015	Candidly Nicole	Himself	Episode: "Gay"
2015	The Thundermans	Cutest Baby Judge	Episode: A Hero Is Born
2016	Mom	Milo	Episode: "Quaaludes and Crackerjack"
2016-2020	Henry Danger	Jack Frittleman	4 episodes
2016	2 Broke Girls	Lawrence	Episode: "And the Lost Baggage"
2018	Raven's Home	Mapa	Episode: "The Falcon and the Raven, Part 1"
2019	Doom Patrol	Steve Larson / Animal-Vegetable-Mineral Man	3 episodes
2019	Team Kaylie	Gerald	Episode: "Lights, Camera, Retraction"
2020	Danger Force	Jack Frittleman	Episode: "The Danger Force Awakens"
2021, 2023	RuPaul's Drag Race: All Stars	Himself (Special guest)	Season 6, Episode: "The Charisma, Uniqueness, Nerve and Talent Monologues"; Season 8, Episode: "Carson Kressley, This Is Your Gay Life"
2022–2023	The Villains of Valley View	Mr. Tennyson	Recurring role
