= Producer's representative =

Film industry role

Producers' representatives (informally reps) aid film producers in selling films direct to studios and networks. Typically they act as an intermediary between a film's producer and distributor. American producers' reps include Blue Harbor Entertainment, Glen Reynolds of Circus Road Films, Scotty Gelt, Jeff Dowd, Buffalo 8, Ben Yennie, Noor Ahmed, and Andrew Herwitz.
