= Some of My Best Friends =

2001 American sitcom television series

- Genre: Sitcom
- Created by: Marc Cherry; Tony Vitale
- Based on: Characters from Kiss Me, Guido by Tony Vitale
- Directed by: James Widdoes
- Starring: Jason Bateman; Danny Nucci; Alec Mapa; Jessica Lundy; Michael DeLuise
- Composer: Bruce Miller
- Country of origin: United States
- Original language: English
- No. of seasons: 1
- No. of episodes: 7 (2 unaired)

Production
- Executive producers: Jonathan Axelrod; Marc Cherry; John Peaslee; Judd Pillot; James Widdoes
- Producer: Julie Tsutsui
- Production companies: Axelrod-Widdoes Entertainment; Paramount Television

Original release
- Network: CBS
- Release: February 28 – April 11, 2001

Some of My Best Friends (previously titled Macho Man and Me and Frankie Z before its premiere) is an American sitcom television series created by Marc Cherry and Tony Vitale, that aired on CBS from February 28 until April 11, 2001. The series was inspired by the film Kiss Me, Guido. The show was cancelled after only five of the seven produced episodes had aired.

== Synopsis ==
Some of My Best Friends stars Jason Bateman as Warren, a mild-mannered gay writer living in Greenwich Village, and Danny Nucci as Frankie, his straight (and at first homophobic) roommate. Alec Mapa played Vern, Warren's flamboyant best friend, who lived upstairs from Warren and usually entered Warren's apartment by coming down the fire escape and through a window. Michael DeLuise portrayed Pino, Frankie's dimwitted best friend. Jessica Lundy appeared as Meryl, Warren's sister and the manager of the apartment building. Also seen on a recurring basis were Frankie's parents, Italian restaurateurs Connie (Camille Saviola) and Joe (Joe Grifasi).

== Cast ==
- Jason Bateman as Warren Fairbanks
- Danny Nucci as Franklin "Frankie" Zito
- Alec Mapa as Vern Limoso
- Joe Grifasi as Joseph "Joe" Zito
- Camille Saviola as Constance "Connie" Zito
- Michael DeLuise as Pino Palumbo
- Jessica Lundy as Meryl Doogan

== Production and development ==
=== Origin ===
Creator Tony Vitale grew up in The Bronx and came to the realization that there were two very different worlds which did not co-mingle. "In the club scene, both communities, gay and straight, co-existed but never really talked to one another. I had friends from both communities and I thought, if both these guys could talk to each other, that could be some exciting, interesting stuff." Vitale took a job at Club Med in the mid-1980s, and befriended his gay boss. "He had the most dynamic personality of anybody I ever met, and I wanted to be like him, but I wanted to be straight and be like him," Vitale said. The two quickly became best friends, and because of their conflicting backgrounds, people described them as "The Odd Couple." One day, someone commented, "It would be great if somebody made a sitcom out of you two," which sparked an idea in Vitale's head for a television show.

After sticking his foot in the door of the film world in the early 1990s, Vitale first pitched the concept of the series to executives as a vehicle for John Travolta and Harvey Fierstein, but he was told that a lead gay character on a television series would never fly. Several weeks later, Vitale happened to be watching The Arsenio Hall Show when Fierstein came out and announced the show as his upcoming project, with Fierstein playing opposite Andrew Dice Clay. Furious that his idea had been stolen, Vitale threatened legal action and quickly scrambled to get a copyright on the story. The result was 96 Greenwich Street, a one-act play which was first staged at The Village Gate in New York City as part of a festival of short plays. Vitale received a positive response, expanded it to a two-act play in 1993 and turned it into a screenplay for a film in 1994. The same year, Kevin Smith's Clerks had been a highly successful film made on a micro-budget, and Vitale set out to make his film the same way.

By 1996, the story was filmed under the title Kiss Me, Guido, picked up for distribution by Paramount Pictures and widely released in 1997. Reviews were generally positive, but several critics picked up on its intended television origins. Roger Ebert wrote, "Like a 30-minute sitcom, it acts like you already know all the characters and are just happy to have fresh dialogue. It's as if the deeper issues have been settled in previous episodes. And yet, also like a sitcom, it's kind of fun as it slides past. Here is a movie that was born to play on television." Vitale again tried to get it turned into a TV series, but it wasn't until after Will & Grace had become a hit that television executives would finally take him seriously.

=== Production ===
The show wound up at the Axelrod/Widdoes production company, which had previously produced another Odd Couple variation titled Brother's Keeper in the 1998–99 season. It was there that Vitale was paired with gay sitcom veteran Marc Cherry, with whom he began developing the show.

=== Casting ===
Jason Bateman arrived at Axelrod/Widdoes to pitch a spec script that he had written, but the producers were more interested in getting him to star as gay lead Warren Fairbanks in their TV series. Bateman did several auditions and readings, but the one person he could not impress was CBS president Les Moonves. "I figured it was perfunctory because Les Moonves had been my boss since I was 16. He was running Warner Bros. when I was doing The Hogan Family." This history wound up working against the actor. "Perhaps he had a bit of a difficult time seeing me as a gay guy, or perhaps he had something completely different in mind, I don't know. But he wanted them to keep looking, and they did, and they entertained a few different people and names and ultimately ended up coming back to me."

Danny Nucci was approached to play straight Frankie Zito by executive producer Jonathan Axelrod, whose then-wife, actress Illeana Douglas, had worked with Nucci in the 1993 film Alive. Nucci was not doing much television at the time, but he liked the pitch and saw Frankie as a very real character. "I've got a buddy from the Bronx, Joey," said Nucci. "Through the years I've watched him grow from looking at the world this way" — Nucci held his palms close together — "to this," he said, stretching his hands apart. "So he's a great template."

The casting of the Vern character (named "Terry" in earlier incarnations) was trickier, as he was originally written to be played by an overweight white guy. But when petite Asian Alec Mapa came in to audition for the part, he immediately won over Vitale. The problem was nobody else thought the flamboyant actor was right for the show. Mapa was repeatedly called back to audition, but it was not until the zero hour that he was finally cast and the character was re-conceived to suit him. It is also worth noting that after the series was canceled, Mapa guest-starred on Cherry's Desperate Housewives as a character named Vern; it is unknown if this was intended to be the same character or merely an inside joke.

=== Troubles ===
The first tip-off that the series was in trouble came early on when actress Josette DiCarlo, who originally portrayed Frankie's mother in the pilot, was replaced by character actress Camille Saviola. DiCarlo was cast in the part before Nucci landed the lead, and since then-32-year-old Nucci was significantly older than the 24-year-old character he was playing, DiCarlo was deemed too young to portray his mother. "I honestly wasn't given any explanation," said DiCarlo, "but during studio audience filming an exec approached me prior to my first scene and said 'YOU'RE Danny's mom?'. I think I knew trouble could ensue."

The next Herculean task was finding a suitable name for the series. "Kiss Me, Guido made no sense, because Warren's not trying to get Frankie to kiss him," explained Axelrod. "And guido, it turns out, was offensive to Italians." Other titles announced were Macho Man and Me and Frankie Z, the latter of which very nearly stuck — the February 2001 issue of Genre and the March 2001 issue of Out both referred to the show as "Me and Frankie Z". Bateman also joked that cast and crew had their hearts set on the title Everybody Loves Rimming.

At the last minute, the show was re-titled Some of My Best Friends, a name reminiscent of the completely unrelated 1971 film Some of My Best Friends Are..., and cited as "the worst title" by both of the show's leads. "It's like you're looking in the dustbin," complained Nucci. "Let's find the worst title for a sitcom that's a mouthful and nobody will get." Bateman conceded, saying, "Even if you happen to think of the phrase 'some of my best friends are gay', and I don't think most people will, that still is not that clever... I can't believe that's the [title] they settled on after looking for one for six months."

Further complications ensued thanks to Bette Midler's unrelated self-titled sitcom Bette. In December 2001, Midler went on Late Show with David Letterman and publicly denounced her own series, calling it "the lowest thing that ever happened to me in my life." Ratings of her show were already steadily declining, so CBS made the unwise decision to put Some of My Best Friends in her timeslot and push Bette back a half-hour in place of Welcome to New York, which was put on permanent hiatus.

The show finally debuted on February 28, 2001, and ranked number 77 in the weekly Nielsen ratings. After two low-rated weeks on Wednesday nights, the episode Blah, Blah, Blah was aired in a high-profile timeslot on Monday night following Everybody Loves Raymond. It failed to attract a wider audience. Although all seven episodes were scheduled (and rescheduled), the show wound up being pre-empted numerous times due to NCAA college basketball tournament, and ultimately two episodes went unaired during its CBS run. The unaired episodes would not surface in the USA until the show was run sporadically on the gay-themed Logo network a few years later.

== Episodes ==
Every episode of the series was directed by James Widdoes.

| No. | Title | Written by | Original release date | Prod. code |
|---|---|---|---|---|
| 1 | "Pilot" | Marc Cherry & Tony Vitale | February 28, 2001 | 40354–001 |
Aspiring actor Frankie Zito answers an ad that reads "GWM Seeks Roommate," thinking "GWM" stands for "Guy With Money," not "Gay White Male."
| 2 | "Fight Night" | John Pardee & Joey Murphy | March 7, 2001 | 40354–006 |
Frankie attempts to hide his gay roommate when his buddies come over to watch the fights.
| 3 | "Blah, Blah, Blah" | Judd Pillot & John Peaslee | March 12, 2001 | 40354–005 |
Warren and Frankie decide to share custody of Frankie's girlfriend (Jacqueline Obradors).
| 4 | "A Brief Encounter" | John Pardee & Joey Murphy | March 28, 2001 | 40354–004 |
Numerous misunderstandings ensue when Frankie's once-worn silk boxers go missing.
| 5 | "Shaggy Dog Story" | Judd Pillot & John Peaslee | April 11, 2001 | 40354–007 |
Frankie and Warren take in a stray dog. Meanwhile, Meryl finally agrees to a date with Pino.
| 6 | "Scenes from an Italian Party" | Terry Maloney Haley & Mindy Morgenstern | Unaired | 40354–002 |
Everything seems to go wrong when Warren orchestrates a 25th anniversary party for Frankie's parents. Meanwhile, Meryl swoons over a completely oblivious Frankie.
| 7 | "The Marriage Counselor" | Marc Cherry | Unaired | 40354–003 |
Confusion abounds when Warren reluctantly gives Frankie's mother some sex tips.

== Reception ==
Critical reaction was mixed, and the majority of TV critics rampantly drew comparisons to the only hit show on the air at the time that featured gay characters, Will & Grace. The Los Angeles Times' Harry Rosenbaum opened his review with the lines, "First Will & Grace, now Will & Guido. Just about, anyway." Critic James Enderst similarly stated, "They're The Odd Couple of the 21st century. Or Will & Grace lite. You decide." New York Daily News critic David Bianculli stated, "[Alec] Mapa plays Vern as a cross between Sean Hayes' Jack on Will & Grace and Suzanne Somers' Chrissy on Three's Company."

On the negative end of the spectrum, many critics denounced the show for being too formulaic. Hal Boedeker of The Orlando Sentinel called the show "hopelessly tired and old hat." Rosenbaum similarly stated, "Familiar stereotypes have always earned easy howls, from minstrel shows and old-time burlesque to political cartoons that deploy exaggeration as parody. The especially obnoxious ones ultimately fail when the multitudes realize their humor is not only hollow but at times twisted and even dangerous." Mapa later lashed back at that review in The Advocate saying, "I was totally slammed in the straight press... The L.A. Times called my portrayal 'dangerous.' But everyone in the gay community totally got it, because it takes one to know one."

On the flip side, many reviews were favorable, as were the critiques of the leads. The Pittsburgh Post-Gazette's Rob Owen stated, "Some of My Best Friends trades on every Italian and gay stereotype possible, but it manages to make these zingers seem fresh thanks to strong performances from Bateman and Nucci." The New York Times' Neil Genzlinger opened saying the show was "shameless in its use of hoary stereotypes. It brazenly reduces gay people, Italian people, Asian people and aging married people to caricatures in the interests of good ratings and corporate profits," but he then concluded, "It's often pretty darned funny."
