= How Fires End =

2019 novel by Marco Rafalà

- Author: Marco Rafalà
- Cover artist: Tran Nguyen
- Genre: Novel
- Publisher: Little A
- Publication date: October 15, 2019
- Media type: Hardback, paperback, and audiobook

How Fires End is a debut novel by author Marco Rafalà. It is a Sicilian American family saga about a vendetta and a curse that follow two families from Melilli, Sicily, during the Second World War to an Italian American community in Middletown, Connecticut, in the 1980s. The novel is inspired by family history and the local folklore of Melilli, Sicily, where the author's father grew up.

== Plot ==
In Melilli, Sicily, in the summer of 1943, tragedy strikes nine-year-old Salvatore Vassallo when his twin brothers die while playing with an unexploded shell. This devastating event fractures Salvatore's faith and triggers a series of misfortunes for his family. Fleeing from the stigma of a supposed curse on their name, the Vassallos seek refuge in America with the help of a former Italian soldier, settling in Middletown, Connecticut. Told from multiple perspectives, including Salvatore's American-born son, David, the novel moves through time to explore legacies of violence, grief, and intergenerational trauma.

== Development ==
Marco Rafalà's debut novel, How Fires End, was inspired by his trip to Melilli, Sicily, and the stories his father shared about life there during and after World War II. The novel took a decade to write. Its stereoscopic framework developed naturally as Rafalà discovered the essential roles various characters played in the evolving narrative.

== Reception ==
J.W. Bonner for Kirkus Reviews wrote that How Fires End "avoids Mafia tropes for a moving depiction of multigenerational loss and love, grief and gratitude, heartbreak and hope… Rafalà accomplishes this in a drama that is akin to Greek tragedy: The behavior of the progenitors plays out in complicated and frequently tragic ways for the younger generations, in an arc that has the dramatic sweep of Aeschylus."

Viviane Crystal for the Historical Novel Society wrote that "Rafalà has created a world of secret sins becoming known, what it takes to forgive, and what happens when the curse extends beyond the grave to everyday life. This tale ends with a redemptive hope that also exudes sadness. Remarkable multigenerational historical fiction."

John Domini for The Brooklyn Rail wrote, "Marco Rafalà rouses us to applause with How Fires End. The novel teeters suspensefully between the good-hearted and bloody-minded. One character, cut down too young, lingers like a painful memory, and one of the survivors may present a still more tragic profile."

Jessica Goodwin for Pangyrus noted that "Marco Rafalà’s debut novel, How Fires End, (Little A) is a powerful tale about the bonds between fathers and sons that attempts to answer this question: is the past ever really left in the past?"

Fran Hawthorne for the New York Journal of Books wrote that "Author Marco Rafala, who is also a musician, carefully weaves the complex strands of this story in reverse chronological order, seeding hints of the various secrets. ... Rafala seems to love language as much as his characters love their farms and their patron saint. That’s a powerful combination, and it fuels a compelling novel."

== Awards and recognition ==
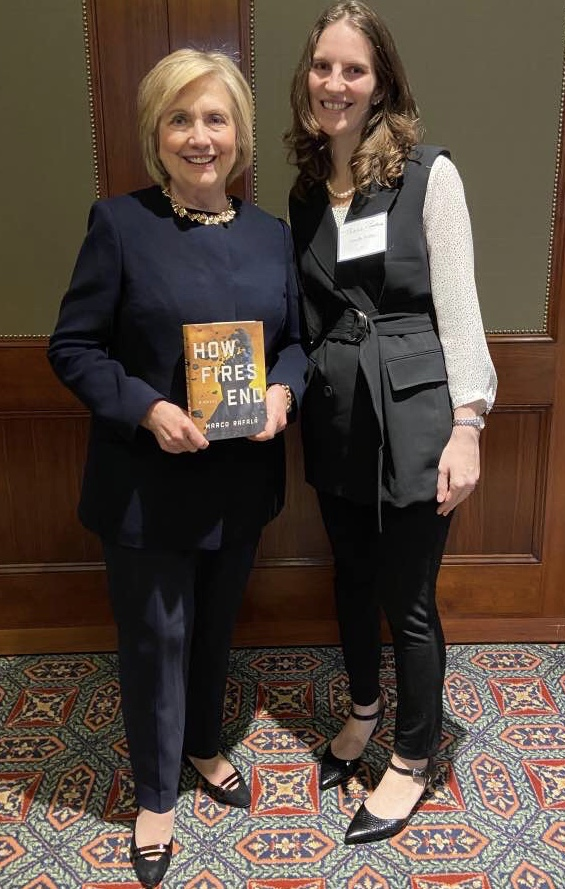
Former Secretary of State Hillary Clinton with her copy of How Fires End

- Named a best book of 2019 by Writer's Bone
- Named a best book of 2020 by The Brooklyn Rail
- Winner of the 2020 Best Book Awards in Literary Fiction at the American Book Festival
- A 2020 Connecticut Book Awards finalist and honorable mention
- Winner of the 2021 Italian American Studies Association Book Award
