= Life's a Beach (2012 film) =

- Theatrical release poster
- Directed by: Tony Vitale
- Written by: Tony Vitale
- Produced by: Richard Gilbert Abramson; Tony Cataldo; Diana Derycz-Kessler; Paul Kessler; Martin Landau
- Starring: Christopher Walken; Morgan Fairchild; Rutger Hauer
- Cinematography: Egon Stephan Jr.
- Edited by: Adam Bernardi
- Production company: Bronx Born Films
- Distributed by: Vantage Media; VMI Worldwide
- Release date: May 22, 2012
- Running time: 88 min
- Country: United States
- Language: English

Life's a Beach (also known as Bachelor Trip) is a 2012 American comedy film directed and written by Tony Vitale. The film stars Christopher Walken, Robert Wagner, Morgan Fairchild, and Rutger Hauer. The movie follows a man who, after being stood up on his wedding day, uses his honeymoon vacation tickets to go on a trip with his best friend to a Club Med-style resort.

The film was shot in 2000 but remained unreleased for over a decade, finally receiving distribution in 2012. It was released under several alternative titles, including Bachelor Trip, Jungle Juice, and Bikini Beach. Some scenes were shot on locations in the Turks and Caicos Islands.

== Plot ==
Darren Fields is left at the altar on his wedding day when his fiancée fails to show up. Left with two non-refundable honeymoon vacation tickets, Darren's best friend and best man, persuades him to use the tickets for a trip to a Club Med-style resort rather than let them go to waste. The two friends travel to a tropical beach destination, where they attempt to enjoy an impromptu "honeymoon." At the resort, both men become embroiled in various comedic situations as they are mistaken for a gay couple. Their vacation is further complicated by the arrival of Darren's former fiancée and her father, Roy Callahan.

== Cast ==
- Darren Geare as Darren Fields
- R.J. Knoll as R.J.
- Christopher Walken as Roy Callahan
- Robert Wagner as Tom Wald
- Morgan Fairchild as Felicia Wald
- Rutger Hauer as Jean-Luc
- Christine Lakin as Rebecca
