= Life's a Bitch =

Life's a Bitch may refer to:

== Albums ==
- Life's a Bitch (album), a 1987 album by Raven

== Songs ==
- "Life's a Bitch" (song), a 1994 song by Nas from his album Illmatic
- "Life's a Bitch", a 1999 song by Shooter from the Songs from Dawson's Creek soundtrack
- "Life's a Bitch", a 2004 song by Motörhead

== Films ==
- Life's a Bitch (2013 film), a Canadian short film
- Life's a Bitch (2023 film), a Belgian black comedy film

== See also ==
- Life Is a Bi..., a 2021 EP by singer Bibi
- Isn't Life a Bitch?, a 1931 French film by director Jean Renoir
