= Tony Vitale =

American film director

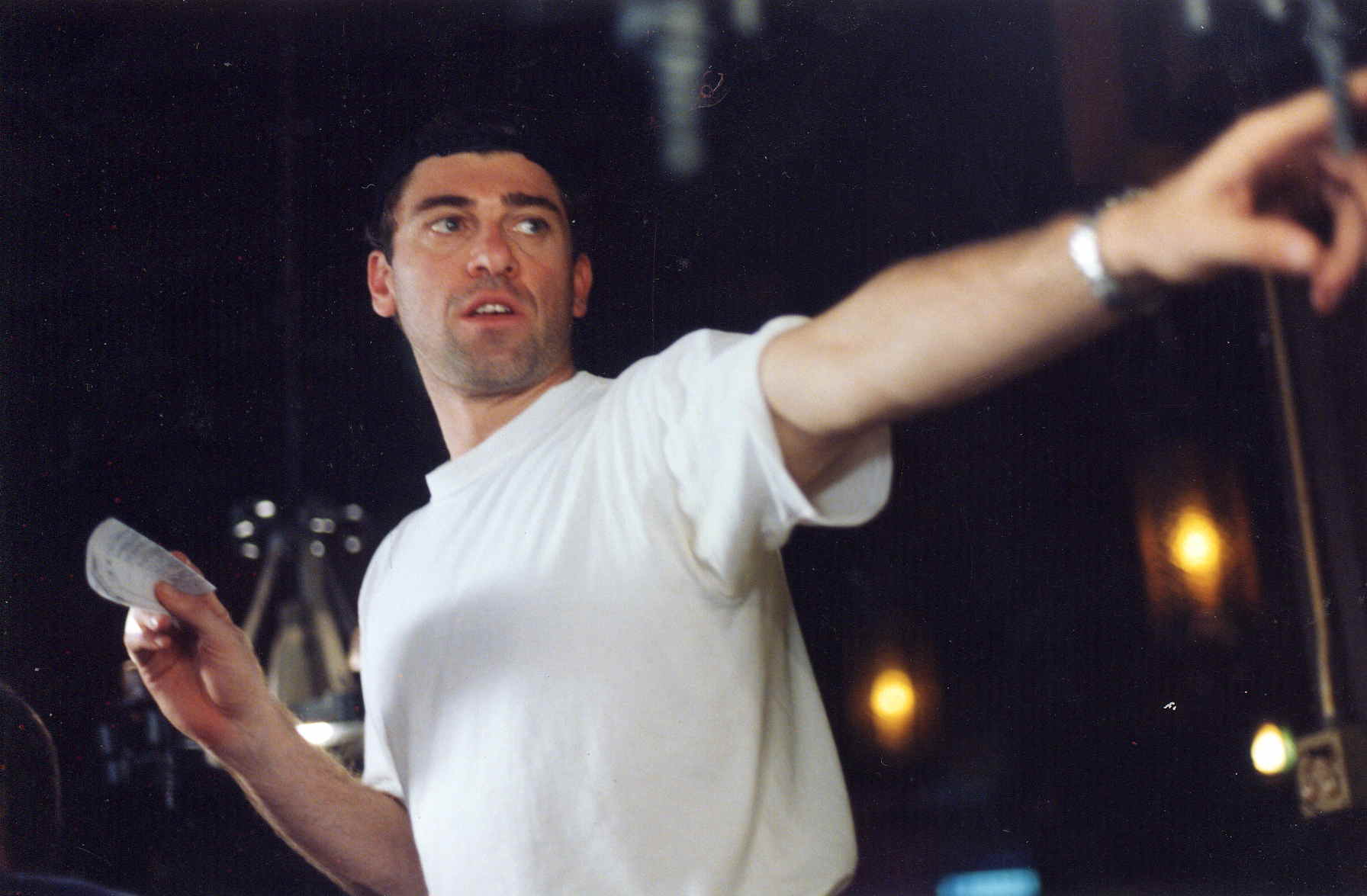
- Vitale on the set of One Last Ride
- Born: Anthony Vitale; The Bronx, New York, U.S.
- Occupations: Writer, Producer, Director, Entrepreneur
- Years active: 1994–present

Tony Vitale (born Anthony Vitale) is an American film director, screenwriter, film producer, and television producer. He is best known for the 1997 film Kiss Me, Guido. More recently, Vitale pioneered the use of Internet Protocol television (IPTV) technologies and broadcast TV programming to help create a dedicated OTT streaming channel, tastytrade.

== Early life ==
Vitale was born in the Bronx. His father, Anthony, worked for the New York City Department of Transportation, and died when Tony was 13. His mother, Mildred, worked as an aide for the New York City Department of Education. Vitale attended Christopher Columbus High School and graduated with honors from Iona University with a degree in finance and minor in communications.

== Film and television career ==
While working on the floor of the New York Stock Exchange including during Black Monday, Vitale attended film classes at night at New York University.

After the death of his mother in 1990, Vitale began working in the film and television industry as a location assistant, eventually working his way up as a second unit director for the opening shot of Robert De Niro’s, A Bronx Tale.

In 1996, Vitale wrote and directed the feature film, Kiss Me, Guido which became an official entry in the 1997 Sundance Film Festival and was released by Paramount Pictures to favorable reviews the same year. Janet Maslin of The New York Times said, "Mr. Vitale makes his first feature with the same kind of colloquial New York humor that Edward Burns gave The Brothers McMullen. A former location manager, he shows off a sure familiarity with his settings while he makes his audience enjoy the very bluntness of his film's caricatures."

In 1999, Vitale pitched his idea of turning "Kiss Me, Guido" into a television show of its own. The pitch wound up with the Axelrod-Widdoes production company ("Can't Hurry Love" and "Brother's Keeper"), who were without a project at the time. Company co-founder Jonathan Axelrod was married to actress Illeana Douglas (a friend of Craig Chester, who had co-starred in the film). Douglas rented the movie and screened it for her husband. Sitcom veteran Marc Cherry was brought in to help develop/produce the series. The series was renamed, Some of My Best Friends starring Jason Bateman and Danny Nucci and ran for eight episodes on the CBS Television network. The sitcom was nominated for a GLAAD Media Award for Outstanding Comedy Series in 2002 along with Will and Grace, The Ellen Show and Sex and the City.

Vitale's second film, Very Mean Men, won the 2000 Seattle International Film Festival: New American Cinema Award. The film starred Martin Landau and Louise Fletcher along with Matthew Modine, Ben Gazzara, Charles Durning and Burt Young.

Vitale's third film, Life's A Beach, stars Christopher Walken, Rutger Hauer, Robert Wagner and Morgan Fairchild. Vitale also directed One Last Ride starring Pat Cupo, Chazz Palminteri and Robert Davi, with Oscar Winner Ang Lee as executive producer. Vitale co-produced the feature film "Man From Elysian Fields" starring Andy Garcia, Mick Jagger, James Coburn, and Anjelica Huston in 2002. Vitale continued to work in television/multimedia, producing shows for CBS, NBC and FOX television.

== Financial media and trading platform ==
In 2012, Vitale pioneered OTT/IPTV technologies as Executive Producer and Director of Programming for the financial news network, tastytrade, with Tom Sosnoff. The tastytrade financial news network features 8 hours of live programming, Monday through Friday, during open hours of the financial markets delivering interactive content to its trading platform, tastyworks. While at tastytrade, Vitale directed and produced documentaries including Cancel Crash about Black Monday the Crash of 1987, aired on PBS, and SOLD!: The Lewis Borsellino Story, about a pit trader.

In January 2021, tastytrade was sold to Britain's IG Group for $1 billion.
