= Emerging Pictures =

American theatrical exhibition company

- Industry: Entertainment
- Founded: 2002; 23 years ago
- Founders: Giovanni Cozzi; Ira Deutchman; Barry Rebo
- Defunct: 2015
- Fate: Acquired by 20 Year Media

Emerging Pictures was a theatrical exhibition company, founded in 2002 by Giovanni Cozzi, Ira Deutchman and Barry Rebo.

Rebo resigned from the company in May 2014. He is currently the Managing Partner of Eclair, USA. Emerging Pictures was acquired by 20 Year Media in 2015.

The stated mission of the company was to create a national alternative theatrical network out of independent venues such as art house theaters, museums and performing arts centers, connected through the use of digital technology. Emerging Pictures specializes in independent film, documentaries, foreign language films and broadcasts of cultural programming, such as opera, ballet, and Shakespeare plays.

== Technology ==
Emerging installs its proprietary server technology into the projection booths of these theaters and delivers the films to the theaters through a dedicated data line. The company calls its technology “i-Cinema,” named for independent and international films, and to differentiate it from Hollywood’s d-Cinema standard. Emerging’s network is currently 130 venues, and is spread out all over the U.S. It has also begun to expand into other countries and has servers in use in Latvia and Australia. Emerging’s platform provides a cost-effective way to distribute films nationally by removing the cost of making or shipping 35mm prints. Emerging’s digital network allows for more flexibility of programming by removing the physical element and thus allowing theaters to program more like a television network with different types of programming in different day parts.

== Films ==
First-run films are provided by all the independent distributors in the U.S. including IFC Films, Sony Pictures Classics, Magnolia Pictures, Kino/Lorber Films, Zeitgeist Films and others. Older repertory titles are provided by Universal Pictures and Janus Films.

== Cultural Programming ==
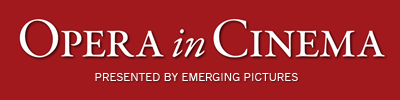
The Opera in Cinema logo.

Among the most successful content in its network are cultural programs that are shown live and near-live. Its “Opera in Cinema” program features operas from La Scala (Milan), the Gran Teatre del Liceu (Barcelona), the Salzburg Festival and the Royal Opera House (London). “Ballet in Cinema” includes ballets from the Bolshoi (Moscow), the Mariinsky Ballet (Saint Petersburg) and the Royal Opera House. “Shakespeare in Cinema” features plays from Shakespeare's Globe (London). The “Opera in Cinema” series is considered to be the only major competition for the Met in HD broadcasts from the Metropolitan Opera in New York City. Emerging Pictures receives its content from a number of content holders: RAI Trade, Opus Arte, Bel Air Media, C Major, and directly from the Gran Teatre del Liceu.

== Distribution ==
In its early years, the company also used to provide marketing, distribution and exhibition services for filmmakers in the theatrical, television and home video markets. The company closed its distribution operation in 2009 to focus on building the theatrical network. The only content for which Emerging currently acts as distributor is the cultural content. Much of that content is distributed by Emerging on a worldwide basis.
