= Lists of Italian Americans =

This is a list of notable Italian Americans.

== Anarchists ==
- Luigi Galleani (1861–1931)
- Arturo Giovannitti (1884–1959) - union leader and poet
- Nicola Sacco (1891–1927) - defendant in Sacco and Vanzetti case
- Bartolomeo Vanzetti (1888–1927) - defendant in Sacco and Vanzetti case
- Carlo Tresca (1879–1943) - newspaper editor, orator, and labor organizer. Leader of the Industrial Workers of the World during the 1910s.

== Architects ==
- Vito Acconci
- Pietro Belluschi
- Giorgio Cavaglieri
- Mario J. Ciampi
- Neil Denari
- Eugene De Rosa
- Romaldo Giurgola
- Michael Manfredi
- Rosaria Piomelli
- George Ranalli
- Mario Salvadori
- Lawrence Scarpa
- Ricardo Scofidio
- Paolo Soleri
- Robert Venturi
- Peter Marino

== Artists ==
=== Comic artists, cartoonists, illustrators ===
- Brian Azzarello - comic book writer
- Joseph Barbera (1911–2006) - animator, cartoon artist, storyboard artist, director, producer, and co-founder, together with William Hanna, of Hanna-Barbera
- Timothy D. Bellavia (born 1971) - children's illustrator, author and founder of the We Are All The Same Inside - Sage doll-making workshop
- Ivan Brunetti (born 1967) - cartoonist and comics author
- Joe Pesci - Italian American actor and musician
- John Buscema (1927–2002) - comic-book artist and one of the mainstays of Marvel Comics during its 1960s and 1970s ascendancy into an industry leader and its subsequent expansion to a major pop culture conglomerate
- Greg Capullo (born 1962) - comic book artist
- Anthony Flamini (born 1978) - comic book writer
- Frank Frazetta (1928–2010) - one of the world's most influential fantasy and science fiction artists
- Dick Giordano (1932–2010) - comic book artist and editor
- Frank Giacoia (1925–1989) - comic book artist
- Carmine Infantino (1925–2013) - comic book artist and editor who was a major force in the Silver Age of Comic Books
- Walter Lantz (1900–1994) - cartoonist and animator, founded the Walter Lantz Studio, created Woody Woodpecker
- Bob Montana (1920–1975) - comic strip artist who created the characters that launched Archie comics
- Joe Orlando (1927–1998) - illustrator, writer, editor and cartoonist
- Jimmy Palmiotti - writer and artist of various comics, games and film
- Leo Politi (1908–1996) - artist and author who wrote and illustrated some 20 children's books
- Don Rico (1912–1985) - comic book writer-artist, paperback novelist, screenwriter and wood engraver; co-created the Marvel Comics character Black Widow with Stan Lee
- John Romita Jr. (born 1956) - comic artist best known for his extensive work for Marvel Comics from the 1970s to the 2010s
- John Romita, Sr. (born 1930) - comic book artist known for his work on Marvel Comics' The Amazing Spider-Man
- Don Rosa (born 1951) - comic book artist for Disney comics
- Eric Stefani (born 1967) - pop musician, former Simpsons animator, and Grammy-nominated composer and writer
- Jim Valentino (born 1952) - writer, penciler and editor of comic books
- Gerard Way (born 1977) - comic book writer; frontman of the American rock band My Chemical Romance

=== Digital artists and illustrators ===
- Ashley Biden (born 1981) - founder of the fashion company Livelihood, daughter of Joe and Jill Biden
- Louise Fili (born 1951) - graphic designer, 2014 American Institute of Graphic Arts Medalist
- Fred Marcellino (1939–2001) - illustrator

=== Painters ===
- John Balossi (1931–2007) - painter and sculptor
- Edward E. Boccia (1921-2012) - painter, teacher and poet
- Alfred D. Crimi (1900–1994) - muralist and painter
- Ettore (Ted) DeGrazia (1909–1982) - painter, best known for American Southwest subjects
- Robert De Niro, Sr. (1922–1993) - abstract expressionist, father of actor Robert De Niro, Jr.
- Sheila Giolitti (born 1957) - painter and art dealer
- Robert Longo
- Nicola Monachesi (1795–1851) painter believed to have painted the earliest frescos in America
- Carla Carli Mazzucato (born 1935) modern expressionist painter
- Attilio Salemme (1911–1955) surreallist painter
- Lucia Autorino Salemme (c. 1919–2010) painter
- Tony Sisti (1901–1983) painter and boxer
- Frank Stella (born 1936) painter and printmaker
- Joseph Stella (1877–1946) - futurist painter known for his depictions of industrial America

=== Photographers ===
- Lynsey Addario (born 1973) - photojournalist known for her coverage of women in war-torn countries
- Severo Antonelli (1907–1995) - legendary figure in Philadelphia Italian American history and the subject of one of the largest ever one-man shows at the Smithsonian Institution
- Franco A. "Frank" Barsotti (1937–2012) - photographer and professor emeritus from the School of the Art Institute of Chicago
- Justin Guariglia (born 1974) - photographer and contributing editor to National Geographic Traveler, and a regular contributor to the Smithsonian magazine
- Isa Leshko (born 1971) - artist/photographer and author of Allowed to Grow Old: Portraits of Elderly Animals from Farm Sanctuaries published by the University of Chicago Press in 2019
- Luis Marden (1913–2003) - photographer, explorer, writer, filmmaker, diver, navigator, and linguist who worked for National Geographic magazine
- Nick Saglimbeni - 3D photographer
- Francesco Scavullo (1921–2004) - fashion photographer known for his work on the covers of Cosmopolitan magazine and his celebrity portraits
- Mario Sorrenti (born 1971) - fashion photographer

=== Sculptors ===
- Vincent Cavallaro
- Mario Dal Fabbro
- Jasper D'Ambrosi
- John DeAndrea
- Joe De Santis
- Arturo Di Modica
- Mark Di Suvero
- Virginio Ferrari
- Thomas Gaetano LoMedico
- Costantino Nivola
- Corrado Parducci
- Piccirilli Brothers
- Italo Scanga - neo-Dadaist

== Business ==
- Josh D'Amaro (born on 1971) - chief executive officer of the Walt Disney Company since 2026* * * * * William Amelio, president and CEO of Lenovo Group Limited
- Daniela Amodei co-founded Anthropic
- Dario Amodei co-founder of Anthropic. Former vice president of safety and policy at OpenAI
- Edward J. DeBartolo Sr.- businessman
- Giuseppe Mario Bellanca (1886–1960)- aviation pioneer, airplane designer and builder
- Paul Busti (1749–1824) - Holland Land Company Agent General (C.O.O.)
- Jack Dorsey - co-founder of Twitter, Inc. and Block, Inc.
- Roger Enrico (1944–2016) - an entrepreneur best known for his lengthy tenure as CEO of PepsiCo
- Fortune Gallo(1878–1970) - opera impresario
- Amadeo Giannini (1870–1949) - Bank of America president
- Lee Iacocca (1924–2019) - As Ford Motor Company executive developed the Ford Mustang in the 1960s, and then revived the Chrysler Corporation as its CEO during the 1980s
- Orra E. Monnette (1873–1936) - Bank of America, Los Angeles founder
- Tony Roma (1923-2003) - founder of Tony Roma's restaurants
- Alberto Sangiovanni-Vincentelli (born on 1947), computer engineer and co-founder of Cadence Design Systems and Synopsys

== Criminals ==
- Salvatore Briguglio - former mobster, one of the prime suspects in the disappearance of Jimmy Hoffa
- Al Capone, "Scarface" - famous mobster
- Michael Franzese - former mobster
- Santino William Legan - perpetrator of the Gilroy Garlic festival shooting
- Joseph James DeAngelo Jr. – serial rapist and serial killer
- Angelo Buono Jr., "Hillside Strangler" – serial killer
- Kenneth Bianchi, "Hillside Strangler" – serial killer

== Food ==
- Emilio Baglioni- chef
- Mario Batali - chef
- Joe Bastianich - chef and television personality
- Lidia Bastianich - chef and television personality
- Hector Boyardee - famous for his Chef Boyardee brand of food products
- Caesar Cardini - creator of the Caesar salad
- Michael Chiarello - celebrity chef specializing in Italian-influenced California cuisine
- Tom Colicchio - chef, restaurateur, political activist, and head judge on Bravo's Emmy Award winning Top Chef
- Giada De Laurentiis - host of the Food Network program Everyday Italian
- Dom DeLuise - actor and celebrity chef who wrote several cookbooks and videos on his family's Italian-influenced cuisine
- Guy Fieri - chef and host of the Food Network program "Diners, Drive-Ins and Dives"
- Nick DiGiovanni - chef and Internet personality who has set multiple food-related Guinness World Records
- Gina Keatley - chef and television personality; influenced charities in New York City
- Sirio Maccioni - restaurateur and author
- Rosanna Pansino - chef and youtuber personality
- Rachael Ray - Food Network chef and Emmy-winning television personality
- Nick Stellino - chef and television personality
- Carlo Vaccarezza - restaurateur
- Buddy Valastro - baker, reality television personality, and businessman

== Inventors ==
- Anthony Adducci (1937–2006) - pioneer of the medical device industry in Minnesota; best known for founding Guidant Corp. precursor Cardiac Pacemakers, inc., now part of Boston Scientific, the company that manufactured the world's first lithium battery-powered artificial pacemaker
- Giuseppe Mario Bellanca - designer of the first monoplane in the United States with an enclosed cabin
- Enea Bossi
- Lorenzo Del Riccio - inventor of fotofinish camera
- Daniel DiLorenzo - medical device entrepreneur and physician-scientist. He is the inventor of several technologies for the treatment of neurological disease
- Federico Faggin (born 1941) - physicist, engineer, inventor and entrepreneur; best known for designing the first commercial microprocessor, the Intel 4004
- Gerard J. Foschini
- The Jacuzzi family - developed the deep well water pump that led to the famous whirlpool bath
- Antonio Meucci (1808–1889) - credited by the Congress of the United States with the invention of the telephone
- Antonio Pasin (1897–1990) - inventor of the Radio Flyer stamped steel toy wagoni
- Sam Porcello (1935–2012) - food scientist who worked at Nabisco on the modern Oreo cookie in particular, was the inventor of the white Oreo cookie creme-filling. His work earned him the nickname, "Mr. Oreo."
- Lorenzo Ponza - inventor of the modern baseball pitching machine
- Francis Rogallo - engineer at NASA, designed the Rogallo wing, which found its greatest success in hang gliders and kites
- Andrea Rossi (born 1950), entrepreneur who claims to have invented the cold fusion device E-Cat
- Alberto Sangiovanni-Vincentelli (born on 1947), computer engineer. Professor at University of California, Berkeley. Co-founded Cadence Design Systems and Synopsys
- Andrew Toti (1915-2005), inventor with more than 500 U.S. patents. in 1995 Toti was honored by the Edison Society
- Andrew Viterbi (born 1935) - engineer, billionaire, cofounder of Qualcomm, inventor of the Viterbi algorithm
- Frank Zamboni - inventor of the modern ice resurfacer

== Jurists ==
=== Judges ===
- Samuel Alito - Associate Justice of the Supreme Court of the United States (2006–present)
- Antonin Scalia (1936–2016) - Former Associate Justice of the Supreme Court of the United States
- William Nardini - Judge of the United States Court of Appeals for the Second Circuit (2019–present)
- Frank Caprio - Chief Judge of the Municipal Court of Providence (1985–2023)

=== Lawyers ===
- Bill Bufalino - American attorney who represented the International Brotherhood of Teamsters from 1947 until 1971.
- Joe Tacopina (born 1966) - lawyer who has represented Alex Rodriguez, ASAP Rocky, Michael Jackson, Kimberly Guilfoyle, Meek Mill, and most notably Donald Trump.

== Law enforcement figures ==
- Joseph Arpaio (born 1932 in Springfield, Massachusetts) - law enforcement officer, most notably as the Sheriff of Maricopa County, Arizona; the child of immigrants from Lacedonia
- Michael D'Andrea - officer of the Central Intelligence Agency, appointed to head the Agency's Iran Mission Center
- Pete DeFazio
- Cate Edwards - daughter of former United States Senator John Edwards and Elizabeth Edwards
- Gil Garcetti (born 1941) - Los Angeles County's 40th district attorney
- Joseph D. Pistone - undercover FBI agent who went undercover as Donnie Brasco and infiltrated the Bonanno crime family
- Louis Freeh (born 1950 in Jersey City, New Jersey) - Director of the U.S. Federal Bureau of Investigation (FBI) 1993–2001
- Rudolph Giuliani - early career was a US attorney in S.D.N.Y., prosecuting high-profile cases, including Cosa Nostra cases
- Dan Mitrione - Italian-born American police officer and U. S. government advisor in Latin America
- Frank Rizzo
- Frank Serpico
- Joe Petrosino - NYCPD lieutenant in charge of the Italian Squad, an elite corps of Italian-American detectives formed to fight the Mafia
- Charles Joseph Bonaparte - member of Theodore Roosevelt's Cabinet and founder of the Federal Bureau of Investigation (FBI)

== Journalism (print and multimedia) ==
- Melissa Anelli - resident of Staten Island, journalist at Staten Island Advance and webmaster of The Leaky Cauldron
- Charly Arnolt - sports journalist (ESPN, OutKick, WWE)
- Carlo Barsotti - emigrated from Italy to New York City in 1872. In 1879, he founded the Il Progresso Italo-Americano newspaper in New York City
- Maria Bartiromo - financial journalist and television host
- Joe Benigno - WFAN sports radio personality
- David Brancaccio - journalist
- Luis Gerardo Bucci – Venezuelan- American journalist former TV host at CNN Sports
- Harry Caray (1914–1998) - born Harry Christopher Carabina, sports broadcaster, did play-by-play for the St. Louis Cardinals, Chicago White Sox, and most famously the Chicago Cubs; Cubs win! Cubs win!
- Tucker Carlson - television host and conservative political commentator
- Matt Casamassina - video game journalist working for IGN
- Danny Casolaro - freelance journalist
- Lindsay Casinelli – sports reporter for Telemundo
- Igor Cassini - journalist
- Chris Cimino - co-host of Today in New York on WNBC, the NBC affiliate in New York City
- Kellyanne Conway - president and CEO of The Polling Company Inc./Woman Trend, and has been a political commentator on CNN, Fox News, and Fox Business
- Anthony Cumia - "Anthony" of the Opie and Anthony show
- Chris Cuomo - television journalist anchor at NewsNation
- Rick Francona - NBC military analyst
- Gaeton Fonzi- investigative ress journalist
- Anthony Fantano - music critic and founder of The Needle Drop, a music related video blog
- Al Giordano - political commentator, and former anti-nuclear and environmental activist
- Michael Gargiulo - co-host of Today in New York on WNBC, the NBC affiliate in New York City
- Al Guido - CEO, San Francisco 49ers
- John Iadarola - progressive political commentator for The Young Turks
- Megyn Kelly - Fox News Channel political commentator and former corporate defense attorney
- Michael Knowles - conservative political commentator and author
- Charlotte Laws - author, columnist, political commentator, former politician, animal rights advocate, anti-revenge porn activist (known as the "Erin Brockovich of revenge porn")
- Steve Lopez - journalist; a columnist for the Los Angeles Times since 2001; the son of Spanish and Italian immigrants
- Rob Marciano - journalist and meteorologist
- Ann Nocenti - journalist, writer and editor, known for her work on comic books and magazines
- Alexandra Pelosi - journalist, documentary filmmaker, and writer; daughter of Nancy Pelosi and Paul Pelosi
- Dana Perino - political commentator and author who served as the 26th White House Press Secretary, serving under President
- Generoso Pope Jr. (1927–1988) - founder of the National Enquirer
- Tony Rizzo - sports anchor with WJW-TV, the Fox affiliate in Cleveland
- Allison Rosati - WMAQ-TV nightly anchor, maternal Italian ancestry
- Dianna Russini - NFL journalist
- Rick Santelli (born 1956) - editor for the CNBC Business News network
- Peter Santenello (born 1977) - videomaker, traveler, and entrepreneur who produces videos about travel and human stories
- Lauren Scala - co-host of Today in New York on WNBC, the NBC affiliate in New York City
- Elaine Sciolino - Paris bureau chief of The New York Times
- Karley Sciortino - writer, television host, and producer
- Jim Sciutto - CNN chief national security correspondent
- Carla Sinclair - editor-in-chief at Craft magazine for O'Reilly Media
- Dick Vitale (born 1939), basketball sportscaster and former head basketball coach

== Military ==
- Sgt. John Basilone - USMC, Medal of Honor recipient of World War II
- Major John Belli - Quartermaster General of the U.S. Army 1792–1794
- Corporal Anthony Casamento - USMC, Medal of Honor recipient of World War II
- Christopher G. Cavoli - commander of United States European Command and Supreme Allied Commander Europe
- Lieutenant General Peter W. Chiarelli
- Lieutenant General Joseph P. DiSalvo - Military Deputy Commander of United States Southern Command
- General Curtis Scaparrotti, Commander of United States European Command
- Col. Luigi Palma di Cesnola - Civil War Union Cavalry officer, and Medal of Honor recipient
- Lt Col Rick Francona - U S Air Force officer
- Major Don Gentile (Dominic Salvatore Gentile) (1920–1951) - US Air Force officer
- Bancroft Gherardi - rear admiral of the US Navy, who served during the Mexican–American War and the American Civil War. The first Italian-American admiral in the US Navy.
- Edmund P. Giambastiani - Vice Chairman of the Joint Chiefs of Staff
- Giovanni Martini - trumpeter; only member of Custer's army to leave the site of the Battle of the Little Big Horn alive
- General Raymond T. Odierno - incumbent Chief of Staff of the United States Army
- Peter Pace - USMC, Chairman of the Joint Chiefs of Staff
- Antonio Pierro - lived to be one of the oldest surviving veterans of World War I
- Joseph L. Romano
- William B. Taliaferro - Confederate general, of Anglo-Italian descent. Though his ancestors came from England to the colonies, his Taliaferro ancestors were originally from Italy.
- Vito Trause - World War II prisoner of war
- Walter Schirra - naval officer and aviator, aeronautical engineer, test pilot, and one of the original seven astronauts chosen for Project Mercury
- Maj. Gen. Francis D. Vavala - Adjutant General, Delaware Army National Guard
- Humbert Roque Versace - United States Army officer and POW in Vietnam
- Gen. Anthony Zinni - USMC, former Commander in Chief of U.S. Central Command (CENTCOM)

== Politicians ==
=== Founding Fathers of the United States ===
- Caesar Rodney - signer of the Declaration of Independence, and President of Delaware was 1/64th Italian
- William Paca - often listed as an Italian American, but based on erroneous speculation about the Paca surname

=== Members of Congress ===
- Joseph P. Addabboo - Member of the United States House of Representatives for New York's 5th, 6th, and 7th congressional districts (1961–1986)
- Hugh J. Addonizio - Member of the United States House of Representatives for New Jersey's 11th congressional district (1949–1962)
- Mark Amodei - Member of the United States House of Representatives for Nevada's 2nd congressional district (2011–present)
- Victor Anfuso - Member of the United States House of Representatives for New York's 8th congressional district (1951–1953, 1955–1963)
- John Baldacci - Member of the United States House of Representatives for Maine's 2nd congressional district (1995–2003)
- Lou Barletta - Member of the United States House of Representatives for Pennsylvania's 11th congressional district (2011–2019)
- John Barrasso - United States Senator from Wyoming (2007–present)
- Mario Biaggi - Member of the United States House of Representatives for New York's 10th, 19th, and 24th congressional districts (1969–1988)
- Kerry Bentivolio - Member of the United States House of Representatives for Michigan's 11th congressional district (2013–2015)
- Suzanne Bonamici - Member of the United States House of Representatives for Oregon's 1st congressional district (2012–present)
- Sonny Bono - Member of the United States House of Representatives for California's 44th congressional district (1995–1998)
- Bob Brady - Member of the United States House of Representatives for Pennsylvania's 1st congressional district (1998–2019)
- Ann Marie Buerkle - Member of the United States House of Representatives for New York's 25th congressional district (2011–2013)
- Louis Capozzoli - Member of the United States House of Representatives for New York's 13th congressional district (1941–1945)
- Mike Capuano - Member of the United States House of Representatives for Massachusetts's 7th and 8th congressional districts (1999–2019)
- Peter A. Cavicchia - Member of the United States House of Representatives for New Jersey's 9th and 11th congressional districts (1931–1937)
- David Cicilline - Member of the United States House of Representatives for Rhode Island's 1st congressional district (2011–2023)
- Silvio O. Conte - Member of the United States House of Representatives for Massachusetts's 1st congressional district (1959–1991)
- Louis Capozzoli - Member of the United States House of Representatives for New York's 13th congressional district (1941–1945)
- Bruce F. Caputo - Member of the United States House of Representatives for New York's 23rd congressional district (1977–1979)
- David Cicilline - Member of the United States House of Representatives for Rhode Island's 1st congressional district (2011–2023)
- Catherine Cortez Masto - United States Senator from Nevada (2017–present)
- Albert W. Cretella - Member of the United States House of Representatives for Connecticut's 3rd congressional district (1953–1959)
- Ted Cruz - United States Senator for Texas (2013–present); of mixed Cuban, Irish, and Italian descent
- Emilio Q. Daddario - Member of the United States House of Representatives for Connecticut's 1st congressional district (1959–1971)
- Thomas L. J. D'Alesandro, Jr. - Member of the United States House of Representatives for Maryland's 3rd congressional district (1939–47); father of U.S. Representative Nancy Pelosi
- Al D'Amato - United States Senator from New York (1981–1999)
- Dennis DeConcini - United States Senator from Arizona (1977–1995)
- Peter DeFazio - Member of the United States House of Representatives for Oregon's 4th congressional district (1987–2023)
- Diana DeGette - Member of the United States House of Representatives for Colorado's 1st congressional district (1997–present)
- Rosa DeLauro - Member of the United States House of Representatives for Connecticut's 3rd congressional district (1991–present)
- Chris Deluzio - Member of the United States House of Representatives for Pennsylvania's 17th congressional district (2023–present)
- Ron DeSantis - Member of the United States House of Representatives for Florida's 6th congressional district (2013–2018)
- Joe DioGuardi - Member of the United States House of Representatives for New York's 20th congressional district (1985–1989)
- Pete Domenici - United States Senator from New Mexico (1973–2009)
- George Anthony Dondero - Member of the United States House of Representatives for Michigan's 17th and 19th congressional districts (1933–1957)
- Mike Doyle - Member of the United States House of Representatives for Pennsylvania's 14th and 18th congressional districts (1995–2022)
- John Ensign - United States Senator from Nevada (2001–2011), Member of the United States House of Representatives for Nevada's 1st congressional district (1995–1999)
- Vic Fazio - Member of the United States House of Representatives for California's 3rd and 4th congressional district (1979–1999)
- Geraldine Ferraro - Member of the United States House of Representatives for New York's 9th congressional district (1979–1985); Democratic nominee for vice president in the 1984 presidential election
- Mike Ferguson - Member of the United States House of Representatives for New Jersey's 7th congressional district (2001–2009)
- James Florio - Member of the United States House of Representatives for New Jersey's 1st congressional district (1975–1990)
- Vito Fossella - Member of the United States House of Representatives for New York's 13th congressional district (1997–2009)
- Virginia Foxx - Member of the United States House of Representatives for North Carolina's 5th congressional district (2005–present)
- Dan Frisa - Member of the United States House of Representatives for New York's 4th congressional district (1995–1997)
- Foster Furcolo - Member of the United States House of Representatives for Massachusetts's 2nd congressional district (1949–1952)
- Andrew Garbarino - Member of the United States House of Representatives New York's 2nd congressional district (2021–present)
- Robert Giaimo - Member of the United States House of Representatives for Connecticut's 3rd congressional district (1959–1981)
- Greg Gianforte - Member of the United States House of Representatives for Montana's at-large congressional district (2017–2021)
- Ellla T. Grasso - Member of the United States House of Representatives for Connecticut's 6th congressional district (1971–1975)
- Michael Grimm - Member of the United States House of Representatives for New York's 11th and 13th congressional districts (2011–2015)
- Felix Grucci - Member of the United States House of Representatives for New York's 1st congressional district (2001–2003)
- Frank Guarini - Member of the United States House of Representatives for New Jersey's 14th congressional district (1979–1993)
- Melissa Hart - Member of the United States House of Representatives for Pennsylvania's 4th congressional district (2001–2007)
- John LaFalce - Member of the United States House of Representatives for New York's 29th, 32nd, and 39th congressional districts (1975–2003)
- Fiorello La Guardia - Member of the United States House of Representatives for New York's 14th and 20th congressional districts (1917–1919, 1923–1933)
- Nick Lampson - Member of the United States House of Representatives for Texas's 9th and 22nd congressional districts (1997–2005, 2007–2009)
- Mary Landrieu - United States Senator from Louisiana (1997–2015)
- James Joseph Lanzetta - Member of the United States House of Representatives for New York's 20th congressional district (1933–1935; 1937–1939)
- Rick Lazio - Member of the United States House of Representatives or New York's 2nd congressional district (1993–2001)
- Patrick Leahy - United States Senator from Vermont (1975–2023)
- Frank LoBiondo - Member of the United States House of Representatives for New Jersey's 2nd congressional district (1995–2019)
- Dan Maffei - Member of the United States House of Representatives for New York's 24th and 25th congressional districts (2009–2011, 2013–2015)
- Joe Manchin - United States Senator from West Virginia (2010–2025)
- Don Manzullo - Member of the United States House of Representatives for Illinois's 16th congressional district (1993–2013)
- Joseph J. Maraziti - Member of the United States House of Representatives for New Jersey's 13th congressional district (1973–1975)
- Vito Marcantonio - Member of the United States House of Representatives for New York's 18th and 29th congressional districts (1935–1937, 1939–1951)
- Tom Marino - Member of the United States House of Representatives for Pennsylvania's 10th and 12th congressional districts (2011–2019)
- Frank Mascara - Member of the United States House of Representatives for Pennsylvania's 20th congressional district (1995–2003)
- Romano Mazzoli - Member of the United States House of Representatives for Kentucky's 3rd congressional district (1971–1995)
- Kevin McCarthy - Speaker of the United States House of Representatives (2023, House member for California's 20th, 22nd, and 23rd congressional districts from 2007–2023)
- Dan Mica - Member of the United States House of Representatives for Florida's 11th and 14th congressional districts (1979–1989)
- John Mica - Member of the United States House of Representatives for Florida's 7th congressional district (1993–2017)
- Guy Molinari - Member of the United States House of Representatives for New York's 14th and 17th congressional districts (1981–1989)
- Susan Molinari - Member of the United States House of Representatives for New York's 13th and 14th congressional districts (1990–1997)
- Albert P. Morano - Member of the United States House of Representatives for Connecticut's 4th congressional district (1951–1959)
- Connie Morella - Member of the United States House of Representatives for Maryland's 8th congressional district (1987–2003)
- John Murtha - Member of the United States House of Representatives for Pennsylvania's 12th congressional district (1974–2010)
- Steven Palazzo - Member of the United States House of Representatives for Mississippi's 4th congressional district (2011–2023)
- Frank Pallone - Member of the United States House of representatives for New Jersey's 3rd and 6th congressional districts (1988–present)
- Jimmy Panetta - Member of the United States House of Representatives for California's 19th and 20th congressional districts (2017–present)
- Leon Panetta - Member of the United States House of Representatives for California's 16th and 17th congressional districts (1977–1993, 1993)
- Bill Pascrell - Member of the United States House of Representatives for New Jersey's 8th and 9th congressional districts (1997–2024)
- John Pastore - U.S. Senator from Rhode Island (1950–1976)
- Nancy Pelosi - Speaker of the United States House of Representatives (2007–2011, 2019–2023, House member since 1987)
- Mike Pompeo - Member of the United States House of Representatives for Kansas's 4th congressional district (2011–2017)
- Jim Renacci - Member of the United States House of Representatives for Ohio's 16th congressional district (2011–2019)
- Rick Renzi - Member of the United States House of Representatives for Arizona's 1st congressional district (2003–2009)
- Peter W. Rodino - Member of the United States House of Representatives for New Jersey's 10th congressional district (1949–1989)
- Teno Roncalio - Member of the United States House of Representatives for Wyoming's at-large congressional district (1965–1967, 1971–1978)
- Marge Roukema - Member of the United States House of Representatives for New Jersey's 5th and 7th congressional districts (1981–2003)
- Michael Rulli - Member of the United States House of Representatives for Ohio's 6th congressional district (2024–present)
- Marty Russo - Member of the United States House of Representatives for Illinois's 3rd congressional district (1975–1993)
- Tim Ryan - Member of the United States House of Representatives for Ohio's 13th and 17th congressional districts (2003–2023)
- Rick Santorum - U.S. Senator from Pennsylvania (2001–2007), Member of the United States House of Representatives for Pennsylvania's 18th congressional district (1995–2007)
- Steve Scalise - United States House of Representatives minority whip and representative for Louisiana's 1st congressional district (2008–present)
- Francis B. Spinola - Member of the United States House of Representatives for New York's 10th congressional district (1887–1891)
- Darren Soto - Member of the United States House of Representatives for Florida's 9th congressional district (2017–present)
- Elise Stefanik - Chair of the House Republican Conference (2021–2025), Member of the United States House of Representatives for New York's 21st congressional district (2015–present)
- Tom Suozzi - Member of the United States House of Representatives for New York's 3rd congressional district (2017–2023, 2024–present)
- Tom Tancredo - Member of the United States House of Representatives for Colorado's 6th congressional district (1999–2009)
- Mike Thompson - Member of the United States House of Representatives for California's 1st, 4th, and 5th congressional districts (1999–present)
- Pat Tiberi - Member of the United States House of Representatives for Ohio's 12th congressional district (2001–2018)
- Robert Torricelli - United States Senator from New Jersey (1997–2003), member of the United States House of Representatives for New Jersey's 9th congressional district (1983–1997)
- James Traficant - Member of the United States House of Representatives for Ohio's 17th congressional district (1985–2002)
- Bruce Vento - Member of the United States House of Representatives for Minnesota's 4th congressional district (1977–2000)
- Dave Weldon - Member of the United States House of Representatives for Florida's 15th congressional district (1995–2009)
- Brad Wenstrup - Member of the United States House of Representatives for Ohio's 2nd congressional district (2013–2025)

=== Minister ===
- Joseph A. Califano Jr. - U.S. Secretary of Health and Human Services 1977–1979
- Frank Carlucci - U.S. Secretary of Defense 1987–1989
- Anthony J. Celebrezze - U.S. Secretary of Health, Education, and Welfare 1962–1965
- 'Maria Cino - U.S. Secretary of Transportation 2005–2007
- Andrew Cuomo - U.S. Secretary of Housing and Urban Development 1997–2001
- John F. Kelly - U.S. Secretary of Homeland Security 2017
- Janet Napolitano - U.S. Secretary of Homeland Security 2009–2013
- Kirstjen Nielsen - U.S. Secretary of Homeland Security 2017–2019
- Leon Panetta - U.S. Secretary of Defense 2011–2013
- Mike Pompeo - U.S. Secretary of State 2018–2021
- Gina Raimondo - U.S. Secretary of Commerce 2021–2025
- John A. Volpe - U.S. Secretary of Transportation 1969–1973

=== Diplomats ===
- Frank Carlucci - U.S. Ambassador to Portugal, 1975–1978
- Peter F. Secchia - U.S. Ambassador to Italy, 1989–1993
- John J. Maresca - U.S. Ambassador, United States Delegation to the Organization for Security and Cooperation in Europe, 1992–1994
- Geraldine Ferraro - U.S. Ambassador to the United Nations Commission on Human Rights, 1993–1996
- Joseph R. Paolino Jr. - U.S. Ambassador to Malta, 1994–1996
- Dick Celeste - U.S. Ambassador to India, 1997–2001
- Thomas M. Foglietta - U.S. Ambassador to Italy, 1997–2001
- Paul Cellucci - U.S. Ambassador to Canada, 2001–2005
- Paul A. Trivelli - U.S. Ambassador to Nicaragua, 2005–2008
- Joseph A. Mussomeli - U.S. Ambassador to the Philippines; Ambassador to Cambodia, 2005–2008;
- Ronald P. Spogli - U.S. Ambassador to Italy and first U.S. Ambassador to San Marino, 2005–2009
- Peter Cianchette - U.S. Ambassador to Costa Rica, 2008–2009
- Luigi R. Einaudi - acting Secretary General of the Organization of American States (OAS)
- Francis J. Ricciardone, Jr. - U.S. Ambassador to the Philippines and Palau, 2002–2005; Ambassador to Egypt, 2005–2008; and Deputy Ambassador to Afghanistan, 2009–2010
- Linda S. Taglialatela - U.S. Ambassador to Barbados, the Eastern Caribbean and the OECS, 2016–2023
- Claire A. Pierangelo - U.S. Ambassador to Madagascar and Comoros since 2022

=== Governors and former governors ===
- John Baldacci - former governor of Maine (2003–2011)
- Donald Carcieri - former governor of Rhode Island (2003–2011)
- Dick Celeste - former governor of Ohio (1983–1991)
- Argeo Paul Cellucci - former governor of Massachusetts (1997–2001)
- Chris Christie - former governor of New Jersey (2010–2018)
- Jon Corzine - former governor of New Jersey (2006–2010)
- Andrew Cuomo - former governor of New York (2011–2021)
- Mario Cuomo - former governor of New York (1983–1994)
- Christopher Del Sesto - former governor of Rhode Island (1959–1961)
- Ron DeSantis - governor of Florida (2019–present)
- Donald DiFrancesco - former governor of New Jersey (2001–2002)
- Edward D. DiPrete - former governor of Rhode Island (1985–1991)
- Michael DiSalle - former governor of Ohio (1959–1963)
- James Florio - former governor of New Jersey (1990–1994)
- Foster Furcolo - former governor of Massachusetts (1957–1961)
- Greg Gianforte - governor of Montana (2021–present)
- Ella T. Grasso - former governor of Connecticut (1975–1980); first woman to be elected governor without following a husband
- Joe Lombardo - governor of Nevada (2023–present)
- Andrew H. Longino - former governor of Mississippi (1900–1904)
- Joe Manchin - former governor of West Virginia (2005–2010)
- Janet Napolitano - former governor of Arizona (2003–2009)
- Philip Noel - former governor of Rhode Island (1973–1977)
- John A. Notte Jr. - former governor of Rhode Island (1961–1963)
- William Paca - signer of the American Declaration of Independence, member of the Continental Congress, governor of Maryland (1782–1785), Federal District Judge (1789–1799)
- John Orlando Pastore - former governor of Rhode Island (1945–1950)
- George Pataki - former governor of New York (1995–2006)
- Charles Poletti - former governor of New York (1942)
- Gina Raimondo - former governor of Rhode Island (2015–2021)
- Albert Rosellini - former governor of Washington State (1957–1965)
- Al Smith - former governor of New York (1919–1921; 1923–1929)
- John A. Volpe - former governor of Massachusetts (1961–1963; 1965–1969)

=== Mayors and former mayors ===
- Hugh Addonizio (1914–1981) - Mayor of Newark, New Jersey, 1962–1970
- Joseph Alioto (1916–1998) - Mayor of San Francisco, 1968–1976
- Lou Barletta (born 1956) - Mayor of Hazleton, Pennsylvania, 2000–2010
- Sonny Bono (1935–1998) - Mayor of Palm Springs, California, 1988–1992
- Luigi Boria (born 1958) - Mayor of Doral, Florida, 2012–2016
- Richard Caliguiri (1931–1988) - Mayor of Pittsburgh, 1978–1988
- Sam Caligiuri (born 1966) - Mayor of Waterbury, Connecticut, 2001–2002
- Mike Capuano (born 1952) - Mayor of Somerville, Massachusetts, 1990–1999
- Anthony J. Celebrezze (1910–1998) - Mayor of Cleveland,1953–1962
- Vincent Cianci, Jr (1941–2016) - Mayor of Providence, Rhode Island, 1975–1984 and 1991–2002
- David Cicilline (born 1961) - Mayor of Providence, Rhode Island, 2003–2011; Jewish mother
- Anthony R. Cucci (1922–2015) - Mayor of Jersey City, New Jersey, 1985–1989
- Thomas L. J. D'Alesandro, Jr. (1903–1987) - Mayor of Baltimore, 1947–1959
- Bill de Blasio (born 1961) - Mayor of New York City, 2014–2022
- John DeStefano, Jr. (born 1955) - Mayor of New Haven, Connecticut, 1994–2014
- Biagio DiLieto (1922–1999) - Mayor of New Haven, Connecticut, 1980–1989
- Michael DiSalle (1908–1981), Mayor of Toledo, Ohio, 1948–1950
- Frank Fasi (1920–2010) - Mayor of Honolulu, 1969–1981 and 1984–1994
- Garry Furnari (born 1954) - Mayor of Nutley, New Jersey, 1996–2003
- Thomas Gangemi (1903–1976) - Mayor of Jersey City, New Jersey, 1961–1963
- Eric Garcetti (born 1971) - Mayor of Los Angeles, 2013–2022
- Philip Giordano (born 1963) - Mayor of Waterbury, Connecticut, 1995–2001 when was arrested for municipal corruption and convicted of sex offender.
- Rudolph Giuliani (born 1944) - Mayor of New York City, 1994–2001
- Dick A. Greco (born 1933) - Mayor of Tampa, Florida, 1967–1974 and 1995–2003
- Reed Gusciora (born 1960) - Mayor of Trenton, New Jersey, since 2018
- Pam Iorio (born 1959) - Mayor of Tampa, Florida, 2003–2011
- Vincent R. Impellitteri (1900–1987) - Mayor of New York City, 1950–1953
- Fiorello La Guardia (1882–1947) - Mayor of New York City, 1934–1945; both parents Italian-born; father lapsed Catholic; mother Jewish
- Mitch Landrieu (born 1960) - Mayor of New Orleans, 2010–2018
- John J. Lombardi (born 1952) - Mayor of Providence, Rhode Island, 2002–2003
- Robert Maestri (1899–1974) - Mayor of New Orleans, 1936–1946
- Anthony M. Masiello (born 1947) - Mayor of Buffalo, New York, 1994–2005
- Thomas Menino (1942–2014) - Mayor of Boston, 1993–2014
- George Moscone (1929–1978) - Mayor of San Francisco, 1976–1978
- Philip Noel (born 1931) - Mayor of Warwick, Rhode Island, 1967–1973
- Nick Nuccio (1901–1989), was two-time mayor of Tampa, Florida in the 1950s and 60s.
- Charles Panici (1930–2017) - Mayor of Chicago Heights, Illinois, 1975–1991
- Joseph R. Paolino Jr. (born 1955) - Mayor of Providence, Rhode Island, 1984–1991
- Bill Pascrell (1937–2024) - Mayor of Paterson, New Jersey, 1990–1997
- George Pataki (born 1945) - Mayor of Peekskill, New York, 1981–1984
- Jim Renacci (born 1958) - Mayor of Wadsworth, Ohio, 2004–2008
- Frank Rizzo (1920–1991) - Mayor of Philadelphia, 1972–1980
- Angelo Rossi (1878–1948) - Mayor of San Francisco, 1931–1944
- Anthony Russo (1946–2021) - Mayor of Hoboken, New Jersey, 1993–2001
- Victor Schiro (1904–1992) - Mayor of New Orleans, 1961–1970
- Frank A. Sedita (1907–1975) - Mayor of Buffalo, New York, 1958–1961, 1966–1973
- Tom Suozzi (born 1962) - Mayor of Glen Cove, New York, 1994–2001
- Louis J. Tullio (1916–1990) - Mayor of Erie, Pennsylvania, 1966–1989
- Ralph A. Villani (1901–1974) - Mayor of Newark, New Jersey, 1949–1953

=== Other ===
- Sal Albanese (born 1949) - New York City Councilor, 1983–1998
- Joe Arpaio (born 1932) - Sheriff of Maricopa County, Arizona, 1993–2017
- Alessandra Biaggi (born 1986) - New York State Senator, 2019–2022
- Jill Biden (born 1951) - First lady of the United States from 2021 to 2025 and wife of former President Joe Biden. She was previously the second lady of the United States from 2009 to 2017.
- Francesca Braggiotti (1902–1998) - First Lady of Connecticut, 1951–1955
- Anthony R. Bucco (1938–2019) - Co-Majority Leader of the New Jersey Senate, 2002–2004
- Barbara Buono (born 1953) - Majority Leader of the New Jersey Senate, 2010–2012
- Frank Carlucci (1930–2018) - U.S. National Security Advisor, 1986–1987
- Anthony J. Celebrezze (1910–1998) - Senior Judge of the U.S. Court of Appeals for the Sixth Circuit, 1980–1998, Judge of the U.S. Court of Appeals for the Sixth Circuit, 1965–1980
- Anthony J. Celebrezze Jr. (1941–2003) - Ohio Attorney General, 1983–1991
- Dick Celeste (born 1937) - Lieutenant Governor of Ohio, 1975–1979
- Paul Cellucci (1991–1999) - Lieutenant Governor of Massachusetts, 1991–1999
- Frank Ciccone (born 947) - Majority Leader of the Rhode Island Senate, 2025–present
- Andrew Cuomo (born 1957) - Attorney General of New York, 2007–2010
- John DeSimone (born 1960) - Majority Leader of the Rhode Island House of Representatives, 2014–2017
- Donald DiFrancesco (born 1944) - President of the New Jersey Senate, 1992–2002
- Paul D'Ortona (1903–1992) - Democratic politician from Philadelphia who served as President of Philadelphia's City Council.
- Michael Eakin (1948–2025) - Justice of the Pennsylvania Supreme Court
- Michael Fedele (born 1955) - Lieutenant Governor of Connecticut, 2007–2011
- Vito Fossella (born 1965) - Borough President of Staten Island, 2022–present, New York City Councilor, 1994–1997
- Attilio R. Frassinelli (1907–1976) - Lieutenant Governor of Connecticut, 1967–1971
- Anthony Gaeta (1927–1988) - Borough President of Staten Island, 1977–1984
- James F. Gennaro (born 1957) - New York City Councilman, 2002–2013, 2021–present
- Eric Gioia (born 1973) - New York City Councilman, 2002–2009
- Andrew Giuliani (born 1986) - Special Assistant to the President and associate director of the Office of Public Liaison for President Donald Trump
- Vincent R. Impellitteri (1900–1987) - President of the New York City Council, 1946–1950
- Ralph J. Lamberti (1934–2025) - Borough President of Staten Island, 1984–1989
- Frederick C. Langone (1921–2001) - President of the Boston City Council, 1966, member of the Boston City Council, 1961, 1964–1971, 1973–1983
- Andrew Lanza (born 1964) - New York City Councilman, 2002–2006
- Adam Laxalt (born 1978) - Nevada Attorney General, 2015–2019
- Sebastian Leone (1924–2016) - Borough President of Brooklyn, 1970–1976
- Nick Licata (born 1947) - President of the Seattle City Council, 2006–2008, Seattle City Councilman, 1998–2016)
- Carmelita Maracci (1908–1987), concert dancer and choreographer who creatively combined ballet arts and Spanish techniques.
- Joseph P. Merlino (1922–1998) - President of the New Jersey Senate, 1978–1982
- Jim Messina (born 1969) - political adviser, White House Deputy Chief of Staff for Operations under President Barack Obama, 2009–2011
- Guy Molinari (1928–2018) - Borough President of Staten Island, 1990–2001
- Susan Molinari (1986–1990) - New York City Councilwoman
- Daniel Mongiardo (born 1960) - Lieutenant Governor of Kentucky, 2007–2011
- Peter Navarro (born 1949) - economist, Senior Counselor to the President for Trade and Manufacturing, 2025–present, Director of the Office of Trade and Manufacturing Policy and the senior counselor for trade and manufacturing, 2017–2021, Director of the National Trade Council, 2017
- Russell M. Nigro (born 1946) - Justice of the Pennsylvania Supreme Court, 1996–2006
- John A. Notte Jr. (1909–1983) - Lieutenant Governor of Rhode Island, 1959–1961
- Frank Olivo (born 1953) - Chicago City Alderman, 1994–2011
- Carmen A. Orechio (1926–2018) - President of the New Jersey Senate, 1982–1986
- John Pastore (1907–2000) - Lieutenant Governor of Rhode Island, 1945
- Ferdinand Pecora (1882–1971) - Justice of the New York Supreme Court, 1935–1950
- Mike Pellicciotti (born 1978) - Washington State Treasurer, 2021–present, Washington State Senator, 2017–2021
- Dana Perino (born 1972) - White House Press Secretary, 2007–2009, White House Deputy Press Secretary, 2005–2007
- Charles Poletti (1902–2002) - Lieutenant Governor of New York, 1939–1942, Justice of the New York Supreme Court, 1937–1938
- Serafino Romualdi (1900-1967) - writer, labor unionist and anti-fascist activist. He was an official with United States unions and anti-communist labor federations in their work in Central and South America.
- Dominick J. Ruggerio (1948–2025) - President of the Rhode Island Senate, 2017–2025, Majority Leader of the Rhode Island Senate, 2009–2017
- Anthony Scaramucci (born 1964) - White House Communications Director, 2017
- Curtis Sliwa (born 1954) - founder of the Guardian Angels, Republican nominee for New York City Mayor in 2021 and 2025
- Al Smith (1873–1944) - Speaker of the New York State Assembly
- Peter Vallone Sr. (born 1934) - Speaker of the New York City Council

== Prelates ==
- Msgr. Geno Baroni (1930–1984) - Catholic Coordinator for the March on Washington for Jobs and Freedom
- Raggio dell'Raggio (born 1963) - New York Italian parish president of Our Lady of Knee Clubbing Most Holy Divine Red Sauce Catholic Church
- Francis X. DiLorenzo (1942–2017) - twelfth bishop of the Diocese of Richmond in Virginia
- John Clement Favalora - Archbishop of the Catholic Archdiocese of Miami
- Fr. Stan Fortuna - Roman Catholic priest
- James Groppi - Roman Catholic priest and noted civil rights activist
- Francis Mugavero - first Italian-American Bishop of Brooklyn, 1968–1990
- Anthony M. Pilla - bishop of the Cleveland Catholic Diocese, 1979–2006
- Joseph Rosati - first Bishop of the Diocese of Saint Louis
- Robert Sirico

=== Cardinals ===
- Joseph Louis Bernardin (1928–1996) - Archbishop of Cincinnati, Archbishop of Chicago
- Anthony Joseph Bevilacqua (1923–2012) - served as Bishop of Pittsburgh and Archbishop of Philadelphia
- Daniel Nicholas DiNardo (born 1949) - Archbishop of Galveston-Houston
- Justin Francis Rigali (born 1935) - Archbishop of Philadelphia

=== Popes ===
- Pope Leo XIV (born 1955) - Pope of the Roman Catholic Church since 2025, first Pope from the United States.

== Scientists ==
- Aristides Agramonte - bacteriologist
- Janis Amatuzio (born 1950) - forensic pathologist
- Dario Amodei- biophysic. CEO of Anthropic, a public benefit corporation dedicated to building AI systems that are steerable, interpretable and safe.
- Giuseppe Mario Bellanca (1886–1960)- aviation pioneer, airplane designer and builder
- John T. Cacioppo - neuroscientist
- Eugenio Calabi (1923–2023) - Italian-born American mathematician specializing in differential geometry, partial differential equations and their applications
- Mario Capecchi (born 1941) - Nobel Prize 2007 winner for medicine
- Nicholas R. Cozzarelli
- Charles DeLisi
- Renato Dulbecco - Nobel Prize 1975 winner for medicine
- Federico Faggin - widely known for designing the first commercial microprocessor
- Robert Fano (1917–2016) - computer scientist
- Ugo Fano (1912–2001) - physicist
- Alessio Fasano - gastroenterologist and researcher at Center for Celiac Research and Treatment at Mass. General Hospital for Children
- Anthony Fauci - immunologist contributing to research in the areas of AIDS and other immunodeficiencies. Chief Medical Advisor to the President from 2021 to 2022.
- Enrico Fermi (1901–1954) - physicist; Nobel Prize 1938
- Robert Gallo - virologist
- Albert Ghiorso - nuclear scientist who helped discover several chemical elements on the periodic table
- Riccardo Giacconi (1931–2018) - astrophysicist; Nobel Prize 2002
- Edward J. Giorgianni - imaging scientist
- Louis Ignarro - Nobel Prize 1998 winner for medicine
- Robert Lanza
- Paul J. Lioy - exposure science
- Mariangela Lisanti - theoretical physicist
- Salvador Luria - microbiologist; Nobel Prize 1969 for medicine
- Mike Massimino - astronaut
- Fulvio Melia - physicist, astrophysicist, and author
- Antonio Meucci - telephone inventor
- Rita Levi-Montalcini - neurobiologist; Nobel Prize 1986
- Lisa Marie Nowak - born Lisa Marie Caputo; astronaut
- William Daniel Phillips - physicist; shared the Nobel Prize in Physics, in 1997, with Steven Chu and Claude Cohen-Tannoudji
- Sam Potolicchio - psychologist specializing in government
- Bruno Rossi (1905–1993) - major contributions to particle physics and the study of cosmic rays
- Gian-Carlo Rota
- Alberto Sangiovanni-Vincentelli (born on 1947), computer engineer. Co-founded Cadence Design Systems and Synopsys
- Jack Sarfatti
- Piero Scaruffi (born 1955) - cognitive scientist
- Walter Schirra - astronaut
- Emilio Segrè - Nobel Prize 1959-winning physicist and academic
- Luigi Luca Cavalli-Sforza (1922–2018) - geneticist
- Giuliana Tesoro (1921–2002) - organic chemist
- Tom Tombrello (1936–2014)- Robert H. Goddard Professor of Physics at the California Institute of Technology
- Michael Viscardi - mathematician
- Andrew Viterbi
- Philip Zimbardo

=== Academics ===
- Michele Boldrin
- Mario Capecchi - University of Utah
- John D. Caputo
- James Carafano
- Frank A. Cipriani
- Thomas A. DeFanti
- John J. DeGioia - President of Georgetown University
- Frank J. Fabozzi
- Eugene Fama - University of Chicago professor of finance and winner of the 2013 Nobel Memorial Prize in Economics
- A. Bartlett Giamatti (1938–1989) - President of Yale University, later Major League Baseball commissioner; Italian father
- Robert Gallucci - Dean of the Edmund A. Walsh School of Foreign Service at Georgetown University
- Lino Graglia - University of Texas in Austin
- Paul J. Lioy - University of Medicine and Dentistry of New Jersey, Robert Wood Johnson Medical School
- Robert Magliola - academic specialist in hermeneutics, philosophy, and religious studies
- Mariana Mazzucato
- Silvio Micali - professor of computer science at the Massachusetts Institute of Technology, distinguished for his work on cryptography
- Fulvio Melia - professor of physics and astronomy at the University of Arizona in Tucson
- Franco Modigliani - MIT economics professor and winner of the 1985 Nobel Memorial Prize in Economics
- L. Jay Oliva - former President of New York University (NYU) and author of many books on European and Russian history
- Camille Paglia - professor of humanities at the University of the Arts
- Michael Parenti - political scientist, Marxist activist
- P. M. Pasinetti - professor of comparative literature and Italian at UCLA
- Walter Piston - professor of music at Harvard University 1926–1960; Pulitzer Prize winner 1948 and 1961

== Writers ==
- Kim Addonizio - poet and novelist
- Vince Aletti (born 1945)- writer, curator, and photography critic
- Maria Arena Bell - novelist, television and freelance writer
- Paul Attanasio - screenwriter
- Ken Auletta - writer/journalist and media critic for The New Yorker
- David Baldacci (born 1960) - best-selling novelist; a distant cousin of John Baldacci, former governor of Maine
- Andrew Berardini - art critic and fiction writer
- Greg Berlanti - television writer and producer
- Giannina Braschi - poet and novelist
- Leo Buscaglia (1924–1998) - author and motivational speaker
- Christopher Castellani - novelist
- Nick Cafardo (1956–2019) - sportswriter
- Duane Capizzi - screenwriter
- Lorenzo Carcaterra - novelist and screenwriter
- Christopher Carosa (born 1960) - author, journalist, and investment adviser
- John Ciardi - poet and etymologist
- Diablo Cody - screenwriter, producer, author, journalist, memoirist, stripper and exotic dancer
- Bob Colacello - writer
- Gregory Corso - poet
- Wendy Corsi Staub - novelist
- John Corvino - philosopher
- Lorenzo Da Ponte - poet, writer, librettist
- William L. DeAndrea - mystery writer
- Keith R. A. DeCandido
- Frank De Felitta - author
- Antonio Fogazzaro - author
- Don DeLillo (born 1936) - author
- Guy Anthony De Marco - author
- Tomie dePaola - author
- Louise DeSalvo - writer, editor, professor, and lecturer
- Pietro Di Donato - writer
- Janine di Giovanni - author, journalist and war correspondent
- John Fante - novelist and screenwriter
- Lawrence Ferlinghetti - poet, essayist and painter
- David Franzoni - screenwriter of Gladiator and King Arthur
- John Fusco - novelist (Paradise Salvage) and screenwriter of Young Guns, Hidalgo, Spirit: Stallion of the Cimarron
- Paul Gallico - Italian father
- Daniela Gioseffi (born 1941) - poet, novelist, literary critic, essayist, performer, social justice activist
- Arturo Giovannitti - poet, political activist
- Barbara Grizzuti Harrison (1934–2002) - writer
- Evan Hunter - aka Ed MacBain, born Salvatore Lombino
- Philip Lamantia
- Teresa de Lauretis
- Luis Marden - born Annibale Luis Paragallo, writer for National Geographic
- Fulvio Melia - author of several popular science books, including The Black Hole at the Center of Our Galaxy
- Charles Messina - writer/director of the play Mercury: The Afterlife and Times of a Rock God, the film Merging, and co-author the book My Father, My Don
- Henry Samuel Morais - writer, rabbi
- Diana Ossana - Academy Award-winning screenwriter
- Camille Paglia - post-feminist literary and cultural critic
- Christopher Paolini - writer. he is best known for The Inheritance Cycle
- Michael Parenti
- P.M. Pasinetti - novelist, playwright, journalist, professor
- Mario Pei
- Tom Perrotta - novelist and screenwriter best known for the novels Election (1998) and Little Children (2004)
- Nicholas Pileggi (born 1933) - writer, producer and screenwriter. He wrote the non-fiction book Wiseguy and co-wrote the screenplay for Goodfellas
- Joseph D. Pistone
- Diane di Prima - poet of the Beat generation
- Mario Puzo (1920–1999) - writer/screenwriter and best-selling author of The Godfather
- Marco Rafalà - first-generation descendant of immigrants from Melilli, Sicily. He is the author of the novel, How Fires End, a work of historical fiction set in World War II Sicily and 1980s America.
- Terry Rossio - screenwriter
- Shane Salerno - screenwriter
- R.A. Salvatore (born 1959) - born Robert Anthony Salvatore, science fiction and fantasy author, best known for his Forgotten Realms and Star Wars novels
- Leslie Scalapino - poet
- Piero Scaruffi - poet, historian, scientist
- Dom (Domenico) Serafini - TV trade magazine editor
- Michelangelo Signorile - journalist, columnist, talk radio host and gay activist
- Michael Smerconish - radio host and television presenter, newspaper columnist, author, and lawyer
- Gay Talese
- Adriana Trigiani
- Jessica Valenti - blogger and feminist writer
- Mark Valenti - screenwriter
- Tom Verducci - sportswriter
- Luisa Weiss - food writer
- Rebecca Zanetti - bestselling author of paranormal romance, contemporary romance, and romantic suspense

== Italian Americans who were first in their field of achievement ==
- Giuseppe Mario Bellanca - designer of the first monoplane in the United States with an enclosed cabin
- Frank Borzage - first person to win the Academy Award for Directing, for Seventh Heaven (1927)
- Enea Bossi - designer of the first stainless steel aircraft and designer of the disputed first fully human-powered plane
- Anthony Celebrezze (1910–1998) - first non-native to be appointed to the U.S. Cabinet
- Geraldine Ferraro (1935–2011) - first woman in U.S. history to be nominated for the vice presidency of the United States from a major political party
- Ella T. Grasso (1919–1981) - born Ella Rose Tambussi Grasso, first woman to be elected governor of a U.S. state without succeeding her husband
- Giuseppina Morlacchi (1846–1886) - ballerina and dancer, introduced the can-can to the American stage
- Nancy Pelosi - first woman in U.S. history to hold the office of Speaker of the United States House of Representatives
- Frank Posillico - Dry January inventor
- Dennis Tito - world's first space tourist
- Joe Valachi (1904–1971) - first member of the Mafia to testify to the Senate about organized crime

== Italian Americans not otherwise categorized ==
- Emile Ardolino - dancer and choreographer
- Donald P. Bellisario - director, former civil uniform service
- Elizabeth Anne Bisceglia - American murderer; father was of Italian ancestry
- Marella Agnelli - furniture designer
- Luigi Antonini - labor leader
- Chris Avellone - video game designer
- Frances Xavier Cabrini - Catholic religious sister, first U.S. citizen to be canonized a saint by the Catholic Church
- Alyssa Campanella - fashion blogger, model, and beauty pageant titleholder
- Oleg Cassini - Russian-Italian-American fashion designer
- Andrew Cunanan - mass murderer; mother is of Italian background
- Charli D'Amelio - TikTok personality
- Dixie D'Amelio - TikTok personality
- Emily DiDonato - model of Italian, Irish, and Native American ancestry
- Ralph DiGia - pacifist and social justice activist
- Tabitha D'umo - choreographer and creative director
- Angelo Dundee - trainer of several boxing champions
- Elizabeth Edwards - born Anania, wife of John Edwards, former U.S. Senator from North Carolina
- Anthony Fantano - music critic and internet personality of Sicilian descent
- Vincenzo Ferdinandi - fashion stylist
- Vanessa Hessler - model and actress
- Ernest Ingenito - mass shooter
- Olivia Jade - social media celebrity and YouTuber
- Stacy London - stylist and fashion consultant
- Luigi Mangione - a suspect in the killing of Brian Thompson, the CEO of UnitedHealth Group#UnitedHealthcare
- Jay Manuel - make-up artist
- Sabato Morais - rabbi leader of Mikveh Israel Synagogue, pioneer of Italian Jewish Studies in America, and founder of the Jewish Theological Seminary in New York City
- Bruno Pauletto - physiologist, shot putter, businessman, coach, author
- Bucky Pizzarelli - jazz guitarist. He was the father of guitarist John Pizzarelli and double bassist Martin Pizzarelli.
- Mike Pompeo - politician, former Central Intelligence Agency director and 70th United States Secretary of State
- Charles Ponzi (1882–1949) - one of the greatest swindlers in American history; inventor of the Ponzi scheme
- Carrie Prejean - model, author, former Miss California USA 2009 and Miss USA 2009 first runner-up
- Angela Carlozzi Rossi - executive secretary of the Italian Welfare League
- John Scarne - born Orlando Carmelo Scarnecchia, gambling expert and sleight-of-hand card performer
- Mary Schiavo - former Inspector General of the United States Department of Transportation
- Michael Schiavo - ex-husband of Terri Schiavo, the woman whose comatose state and subsequent court case garnered much media attention
- Christian Siriano - fashion designer from New York
- Milton Sirotta - at age nine coined the term googol
- Michael Smerconish - CNN journalist
- Carmela Teoli - 14-year-old mill worker whose Congressional testimony helped end the 1912 Lawrence textile strike
- Jack Valenti - of Sicilian heritage, president of the Motion Picture Association of America from 1966 to 2007
- Elettra Rossellini Wiedemann - fashion model, and socialite
- Louis Zamperini - athlete and army officer who was a Prisoner of war

== See also ==
- List of Italians
- List of Sicilian Americans
- List of Italian Britons
- List of Italian-American television characters
- List of Italian-American women writers
