= DiLorenzo =

DiLorenzo is an Italian surname. Notable people with the surname include:

- Francis X. DiLorenzo (1942–2017), American Roman Catholic bishop
- Daniel DiLorenzo, medical device entrepreneur and physician-scientist
- Thomas DiLorenzo, American economics professor
- Vincent Dilorenzo (1911–1989), English rugby league footballer who played in the 1930s and 1940s, and rugby union footballer who played in the 1940s
- Danielle DiLorenzo, a contestant of the American reality television show Survivor
- Laura DiLorenzo, co-protagonist of the 2007 homemade music video Chongalicious
