= General Order No. 1 (Gulf War) =

US military general order

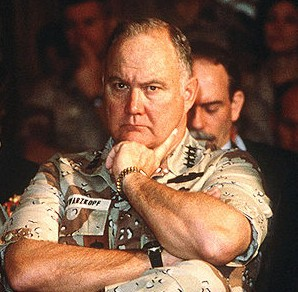
General Schwarzkopf during the Gulf War

General Order No. 1 was a general order issued by General Norman Schwarzkopf Jr. to United States Central Command in the Middle East during the Gulf War (Operations Desert Shield and Desert Storm). The order contains provisions restricting the behavior of troops and was intended to show respect to the laws of Saudi Arabia where many US troops were deployed. The order, for the first time in the US Army, prohibited the possession, manufacture, sale or consumption of any alcoholic beverage. It also restricted the possession of "sexually explicit" material, which was broadly defined and led to relatively innocuous documents such as underwear catalogues and bodybuilding magazines being banned. A ban on the taking of war trophies from Iraqi prisoners was later amended to permit US troops to retain captured bayonets as souvenirs. The order influenced those issued in later campaigns, many of which also include bans on alcohol consumption even where US troops are not deployed in Muslim countries.

== Background ==
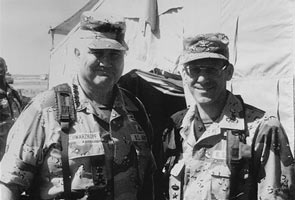
Schwarzkopf and Ruppert in Iraq, March 1991

Saddam Hussein's Iraq invaded neighboring Kuwait on August 2, 1990. United Nations Security Council Resolution 660 called for the withdrawal of Iraqi forces but this was not forthcoming. The United States and other nations rushed troops to defend Saudi Arabia from a potential attack as part of Operation Desert Shield. US forces in Saudi Arabia were part of United States Central Command and commanded by General Norman Schwarzkopf Jr. Schwarzkopf issued General Order No. 1 on 30 August 1990, which was intended to implement measures to avoid insulting their Saudi hosts.

The order was the first of a series intended to guide US troops during the upcoming operations and Schwarzkopf considered them essential to preserve good relations with the Saudi government. The Saudi Government had legal restrictions on some activities such as the drinking of alcohol, public nudity and gambling (activities that were acceptable in the United States) which it justified on the grounds of the country's Muslim faith. General Order No. 1 restricted some of these activities for the duration of the operations.

Schwarzkopf ordered the Staff Judge Advocate to Central Command, Colonel Raymond C. Ruppert, to produce the order. It was drafted by Ruppert and his subordinate Lieutenant-Colonel William J. Camp in August 1990 while in Florida, awaiting deployment to Saudi Arabia. Subtitled "Prohibited Activities for US Personnel Serving in the USCENTCOM A[rea] O[f] R[esponsibility]", the order laid out the restriction in nine categories: firearms and ammunition, entry into mosques, alcoholic beverages, pornography, other "sexually explicit" imagery, gambling, archaeological artifacts, exchanging currency, and war trophies. The order applied to all US military personnel and to US civilians serving with, employed by or accompanying the US armed forces in the area of responsibility. All infractions would be punished under the Uniform Code of Military Justice for serving personnel and by administrative sanctions for civilians. An amnesty period of 72 hours was permitted for personnel to dispose of any items prohibited by the order. The US Army XVIII Airborne Corps intended to establish a military prison in Saudi Arabia for those convicted of offenses under the general order but permission was denied by Schwarzkopf, who wanted to retain military police personnel for the processing of Iraqi prisoners. Instead, Schwarzkopf ordered that offenders be returned to the United States for court-martial.

== Alcohol ==
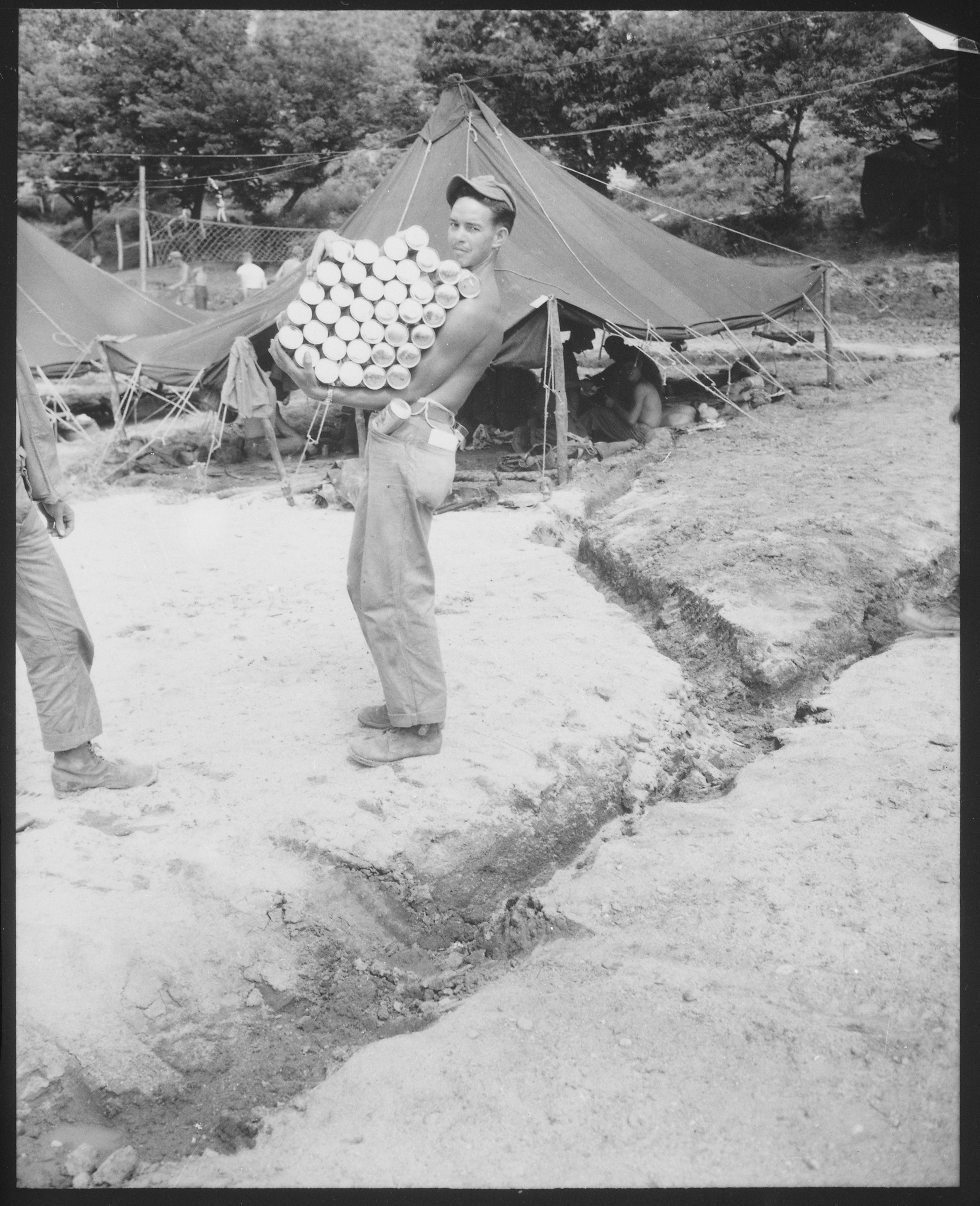
Earlier American troops, such as this marine in Korea in 1951, had been allowed to drink alcohol.

General Order No. 1 prohibited all US personnel from possessing, making, selling or consuming any alcoholic beverage, the first time such an order had applied to the US Army. Though this was considered a radical step, it was considered necessary for continued good relations in a country that prohibited alcohol to any of its citizens. Although not its intention, the order led to a reduction in alcohol-related incidents and an improvement in order and discipline among the troops.

The positive benefits of the order led to it being broadly applied to later US operations, whether in Muslim countries or not. The US Air Force General William R. Looney III disagreed with the broader application of alcohol bans and, when commanding in Puerto Rico after the war, successfully lobbied for permission for his troops to ignore a similar order. The future Secretaries of Defense Robert Gates and Leon Panetta inadvertently violated the order by bringing liquor with them on an August 2007 visit to Baghdad during the Iraq War.

== Religious restrictions ==
The order prohibited gatherings for non-Muslim acts of worship outside of US-controlled sites in accordance with Saudi religious law. Although not prohibited by the order, Jewish military personnel were ferried to ships offshore before conducting religious services. Entry into Saudi mosques, where not necessary for military purposes, was prohibited by the order.

Although not explicitly mentioned in the order, the proselytising of Muslims was prohibited. Personal bibles were allowed but had to be shipped directly to US bases or else risk confiscation by Saudi customs officials. Soldiers were also ordered not to wear crucifix jewelry on show and chaplains were instructed to remove their emblems of faith when outside of US-controlled sites. In a similar manner, at the request of the Saudi government, the US military agreed to refer to its chaplains as "morale officers" and to "church services" as "morale services", though this was rescinded in January 1991 by Lieutenant-General Chuck Horner.

== Sexually suggestive material ==
The order defined prohibited pornographic material as that which displayed human genitalia, uncovered women's breasts or any sexual act, including any works of art. "Sexually explicit" material which was also prohibited was defined as any "medium displaying the human anatomy in any unclothed or semi-clothed manner and which displays portions of the human torso". This extended to material where the "human anatomy" was only implied and resulted in items such as bodybuilding magazines, swimsuit photographs and underwear catalogues being banned or censored. Such material was illegal for Saudi citizens to possess.

== Other provisions ==
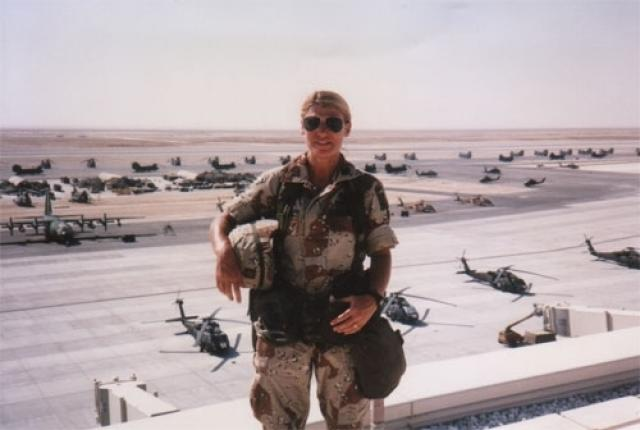
Ann E. Dunwoody, a female officer of the US Army in Saudi Arabia during the war

Other provisions of the order included the prohibition of personal firearms and gambling (including pools, lotteries and raffles). The removal of archaeological artifacts was also prohibited as was exchanging money at anything other than the official Saudi government rate. The final provision prohibited the collection of war trophies and noted that all captured Iraqi military equipment was to be considered property of the US government, though exceptions were made for hats, shirts, belts, insignia, canteens, mess equipment, helmets and ammunition pouches. After the liberation of Kuwait led large amounts of equipment to fall into US hands, this prohibition was repeatedly questioned and the dissent led to the only change to any part of the general order during the war when Schwarzkopf permitted US personnel to take Iraqi bayonets as souvenirs.

Although not part of the general order, female US personnel were required to wear "modest" dress and avoid walking with or sharing a car with a man other than their husband. Public displays of affection were also prohibited. These restrictions were variable depending on location; they were strictest in urban areas, within the United Arab Emirates and within Oman, but were relaxed in areas with few Saudi nationals present. Despite the restrictions, the sight of American women driving military vehicles led to Saudi women holding driving protests against the laws that prevented them from driving.

== Legacy ==
General Order No. 1 remained in place unchanged, but for the exception for bayonet trophies, throughout Operation Desert Shield and Operation Desert Storm (the phase of the war January–February 1991 that involved the liberation of Kuwait and partial invasion of Iraq). There was some criticism of the order; US Air Force intelligence officer Rick Francona recalled that it was "grossly unpopular" among the troops. The need for the order led some commentators to ask why American forces were being deployed to protect an undemocratic state which did not permit its people the civil liberties taken for granted in the US.

General Order No. 1 influenced similar orders for subsequent campaigns. An alcohol prohibition was ordered for Operation Provide Comfort, the post–Gulf War humanitarian mission to Kurds in Northern Iraq. An alcohol prohibition and ban on taking trophies was also implemented for American UNITAF forces serving in Somalia 1992–93, though the fact that it did not apply to American troops under direct United Nations command led to some complaints about unfairness. The troops serving in Operation Uphold Democracy, the 1994–1995 intervention in non-Muslim Haiti, were also subject to an alcohol ban. The General Order No. 1 issued to American troops in Iraq and Afghanistan both prohibited alcohol and extended the provisions to include prohibitions on adopting stray dogs as pets or mascots.
