= Giorgianni =

Giorgianni is an Italian surname, derived from the given name Giorgio (George). Notable people with the surname include:

- Edward J. Giorgianni (born 1944), American imaging scientist
- Sal Giorgianni, American saxophonist
