= John Balossi =

American painter (1931 - 2007)

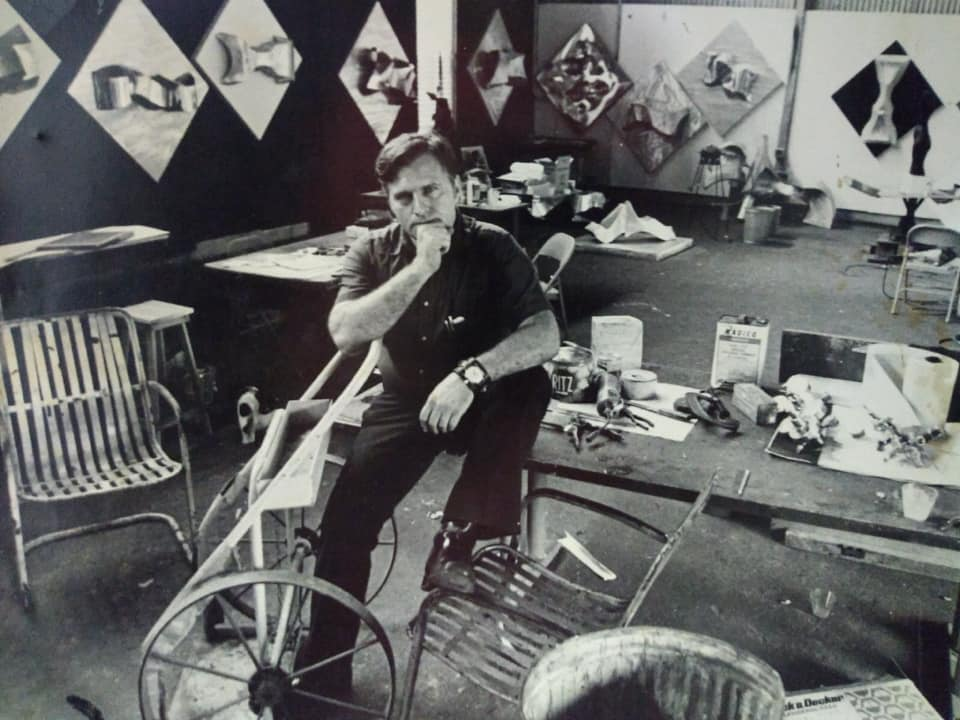
- John Balossi in his studio
- Born: May 28, 1931; New York City, New York, U.S.
- Died: April 8, 2007 (aged 75); San Juan, Puerto Rico
- Known for: Painting and Sculpting

John Balossi (May 28, 1931 – April 8, 2007) was a painter and sculptor.

== Biography ==
Born in New York City, he received his BFA and master's degree at Columbia University in N.Y.C. He was an associate Professor of Fine Arts at the University of Puerto Rico in Río Piedras.

Balossi was also a ceramist and printmaker, and had more than thirty solo exhibitions in Puerto Rico, New York, and Paris, France.

Many of his paintings and sculptures are of horses.

His work can be found in the Finch College Museum (N.Y.); Museum of Fine Arts (Fort Lauderdale); Chase Manhattan Fine Arts Center; University of Massachusetts Amherst; Museo de Arte de Puerto Rico; Ponce Art Museum; and in other public and private art collections.

== Works ==
John Balossi's work include:

- A caballo, 2001, acrylic painting on canvas
- Aluminum Sculpture. Cloud Series, 1976, aluminum sculpture
- Caballo con pájaro, 1984, acrylic painting on canvas
- Cavalcade, 2005, acrylic painting on canvas
- Ceramic Horse, 1986, ceramic sculpture on wooden base
- Green Horse, 1976, acrylic painting on canvas
- Horse, 1993, ceramic sculpture on wooded base
- Soldier Wall, 1967, steel sculpture on wooden base
- The conclave has spoken, oil painting on canvas
- The Trapped Sun, 1981, painting

== Museum Collections ==
- Finch College Museum, New York
- Museum of Fine Arts, Fort Lauderdale
- Chase Manhattan Collection, New York
- Ponce Art Museum, Ponce
- Museo de Arte de Puerto Rico
- Fine Arts Center, University of Massachusetts, Amherst
- Drew University, Madison, New Jersey
- Museo Rodante, Department of Education, Hatio Rey
- University of Puerto Rico Museum, Rio Piedras
- Museo de Puerto Rico, San Juan
- Library of Congress, Washington D.C.
- Maria Elena Vila Collection, P.R.
- Dr. Briseida Feliciano Collection, Caguas P.R.
- Estate of Denise Sigaud, Paris, France
- Connie Hamilton Collection, New York, N.Y. USA
- Piero Sanavio Collection, Paris, France and Rome, Italy.

== See also ==
- List of Italian Americans
