= Janis Amatuzio =

American forensic pathology specialist

- Born: 1950 (age 74–75); Minnesota, USA
- Occupation: Pathologist

Janis Carol Amatuzio (born 1950) is an American forensic pathology specialist. She has authored books and has practiced forensic science for 20 years. Amatuzio is known as the "compassionate coroner".

== Early life ==
Amatuzio was born in Minnesota and is Italian American. Her father was Donald Amatuzio, a physician who died in 2006.

== Career ==
Amatuzio trained at the University of Minnesota and the Hennepin County Medical Center before founding Midwest Forensic Pathology in Minneapolis. She was the Medical Examiner in Anoka County and served as coroner in a number of counties in Minnesota and Wisconsin until 2009.

A protégée of Amatuzio, Dr. A. Quinn Strobl, performed the autopsy of the famous singer Prince in 2016.

== Other work ==
Amatuzio has appeared on the crime TV series Deadly Women and Forensic Files.

== Personal life ==
Amatuzio lives in Coon Rapids, Minnesota.

== Books ==
- Forever Ours: Real Stories of Immortality and Living from a Forensic Pathologist, 2007
- Beyond Knowing: Mysteries and Messages of Death and Life from a Forensic Pathologist, 2008

== See also ==
- List of Italian Americans
- List of people from Minnesota
