= Siemens Foundation =

- Founded: 1998
- Founder: Albert Hoser
- Type: non-profit organization

The Siemens Foundation is a non-profit organization in the United States, established by Siemens AG in 1998. It is responsible for the Siemens Competition (formerly Siemens Westinghouse Competition), a prestigious science award for U.S. high school students, which Siemens established after its 1997 acquisition of Westinghouse Electric Corporation turned out not to include the rights to the existing Westinghouse Science Talent Search (next sponsored by Intel and then Regeneron).

The Siemens Foundation is also responsible for the Siemens Science Day (established in 2005) for promoting math and science education, the Siemens AP Scholar Award, and National Merit Finalist scholarships to children of Siemens employees.

Some other internationally operating Siemens foundations were established by Siemens AG in 2008 to enhance Corporate Social Responsibility through support of natural scientific education and by initiating welfare aid and cultural programs. These foundations include the German Siemens Stiftung which operates in Africa, Latin America and Europe and is currently headed by Dr. Nina Smidt. Further foundations were established in France, Argentine, Denmark, Brazil and Columbia.

== Leadership ==
Albert Hoser is the chairman and chief executive officer of the foundation. He established it in July 1998 to promote and support science and mathematics education in the United States. He was president and chief executive officer of Siemens Corporation from January 1, 1991, until his retirement in 1999. He had been with Siemens since 1954 and held a variety of management and executive positions in Europe, Japan, India and the United States.

From 1969 to 1980 he headed various commercial departments in Germany, including the Measurement and Process Technology Group in Karlsruhe, commercial departments in Bremen, and the Standard Products Group in Erlangen. In 1980, he became president and chief executive officer of Siemens Japan, until becoming president and chief executive officer of Siemens India, Ltd in 1984. He serves on the board of trustees of the Center for Excellence in Education, in Vienna, Virginia.
