= Siemens Competition =

Science competition for US high school students

The Siemens Competition was a science competition for US high school students funded by the Siemens Foundation, which was administered by the College Board from 1999-2013 and by Discovery Education from 2014–2017. The Siemens Foundation released a statement on February 1, 2018 stating that the 2017 iteration of the competition was the final one.

== History ==
Siemens purchased Westinghouse Electric Corporation's power generation unit in 1997, but sponsorship of the Westinghouse Science Talent Search (now the Regeneron Science Talent Search) was not part of the deal. When Siemens lost the bidding for the competition to Intel, Siemens decided to create the Siemens Foundation to continue the tradition using the well-known Westinghouse name, calling the new competition the Siemens Westinghouse Competition (SWC) and, later, the Siemens Competition. The first awards were given in 1999.

The competition had the same goals as the old Westinghouse Competition, but with several added dimensions, most notably awards for team projects and regional awards. The regional finals were held in cooperation with six partner universities: MIT, Georgia Tech, Caltech, University of Texas at Austin, University of Notre Dame, and Carnegie Mellon.

2007 was the first year that women won the top prizes in both the individual and team competitions at Siemens. The individual winner was Isha Jain of Bethlehem, Pennsylvania, and the top team winners were Janelle Schlossberger and Amanda Marinoff of Plainview, New York.

The Siemens Competition ran for 18 years. On February 1, 2018, the Siemens Foundation announced that the 2017 competition would be its last.

== Selection process ==
Each year, research reports submitted before a late-September to early-October deadline were subjected to a blind reading. 300 outstanding research reports, from more than 1600 entries, were selected as semifinalists. All semifinalists received a special recognition package, with their names announced in a full page USA Today advertisement.

From the pool of semifinalists, 30 individuals and 30 teams (2–3 students) were selected as Regional Finalists and invited to compete during the month of November at one of the six partner universities (Caltech, UT Austin, Notre Dame, Carnegie Mellon, MIT, and Ga. Tech). In addition to project content, judging was also based on the oral presentation, poster display, cited references, and the question and answer session. All regional finalists received $1,000 scholarships and bronze medals. One individual and one team from each region advanced to the National Finals. These Regional winners received $3,000 (individual) or $6,000 (total for teams) scholarships, and silver medals.

The National Finalists (6 individual and 6 team projects) received an all-expense-paid trip during the first weekend of December to Washington, D.C. Winners of the Nationals received scholarships ranging from $10,000 to the coveted $100,000 grand prize for the top individual and top team.

== Winners ==
Below is a list of the winners for each year of the Siemens Competition.

=== Individual Winners ===
- 1999: Lisa Harris, Dalton School (New York, NY)
- 2000: Mariangela Lisanti, Staples High School (Westport, CT)
- 2001: Ryan Patterson, Central High School (Grand Junction, CO)
- 2002: Steven J. Byrnes, Roxbury Latin School (Lexington, MA)
- 2003: Yin Li, Stuyvesant High School (New York, NY)
- 2004: Aaron Goldin, San Dieguito High School Academy (Encinitas, CA)
- 2005: Michael Viscardi, Josan Academy (San Diego, CA)
- 2006: Dmitry Vaintrob, South Eugene High School (Eugene, OR)
- 2007: Isha Jain, Freedom High School (Bethlehem, PA)
- 2008: Wen Chyan, Texas Academy of Mathematics and Science (Denton, TX)
- 2009: Ruoyi Jiang, Ward Melville High School (East Setauket, NY)
- 2010: Benjamin Clark, Penn Manor High School (Millersville, PA)
- 2011: Angela Zhang, Monta Vista High School (Cupertino, CA)
- 2012: Kensen Shi, A&M Consolidated High School (College Station, TX)
- 2013: Eric Chen, Canyon Crest Academy (San Diego, CA)
- 2014: Peter Tian, The Wellington School (Columbus, OH)
- 2015: Maria Elena Grimmett, Oxbridge Academy of the Palm Beaches (West Palm Beach, FL)
- 2016: Vineet Edupuganti, Oregon Episcopal School (Portland, OR)
- 2017: Andrew Komo, Montgomery Blair High School (Silver Spring, MD)

=== Team Winners ===
- 1999: Daniar Hussain and Steven Malliaris, New Trier High School (Winnetka, Illinois)
- 2000: Charles Olbert, Christopher Clearfield and Nikolas Williams, The North Carolina School of Science and Math (Durham, NC)
- 2001: Shira Billet and Dora Sosnowik, Stella K. Abraham High School for Girls (Hewlett Bay Park, NY)
- 2002: Juliet R. Girard and Roshan D. Prabhu, William L. Dickinson High School (Jersey City, NJ)
- 2003: Mark Schneider and Jeffrey Schneider, South Windsor High School (South Windsor, CT)
- 2004: Lucie Guo and Xianlin Li, The North Carolina School of Science and Math (Durham, NC)
- 2005: Anne Lee, Phoenix Country Day School (Paradise Valley, AZ) and Albert Shieh, Chaparral High School (Scottsdale, AZ)
- 2006: Scott Molony, Steven Arcangeli, and Scott Horton, Oak Ridge High School (Oak Ridge, TN)
- 2007: Janelle Schlossberger and Amanda Marinoff, John F. Kennedy High School (Plainview, NY)
- 2008: Sajith Wickramasekara and Andrew Guo, North Carolina School of Science and Mathematics (Durham, NC)
- 2009: Sean Karson, Trinity Preparatory High School (Winter Park, FL), Dan Liu, Liberal Arts and Science Academy High School (Austin, TX), and Kevin Chen, William P. Clements High School (Sugar Land, TX)
- 2010: Youkow Homma, Lyndon Ji, Carmel High School (Carmel, IN), and Jeffrey Shen, Park Tudor School (Indianapolis, IN)
- 2011: Ziyuan Liu, and Cassee Cain, Oak Ridge High School (Oak Ridge, TN)
- 2012: Jeremy Applebaum, William Gil, and Allen Shin, George W. Hewlett High School (Hewlett, NY)
- 2013: Priyanka Wadgaonkar, Zainab Mahmood and JiaWen Pei, George W. Hewlett High School (Hewlett, NY)
- 2014: Eli Echt-Wilson and Albert Zuo, La Cueva High School (Albuquerque, NM)
- 2015: Kimberly Te and Christine Yoo, Manhasset High School (Manhasset, NY)
- 2016: Adhya Beesam and Shriya Beesam, Plano East Senior High School (Plano, TX)
- 2017: Jillian Parker, Half Hollow Hills High School West, Jiachen Lee and Arooba Ahmed, Half Hollow Hills High School East (Dix Hills, NY)

=== High schools with the most finalists ===
Several schools were consistently successful in producing Regional and National Finalists. By far the most finalists came from North Carolina School of Science and Mathematics, and many finalists also came from the Texas Academy of Mathematics and Science, Troy High School, Thomas Jefferson High School for Science and Technology, and Oak Ridge High School. The schools listed below produced double-digit regional finalists.

Schools with the Most Regional and National Finalists
| School | City | State | Regional | National |
|---|---|---|---|---|
| North Carolina School of Science and Mathematics | Durham | NC | 65 | 15 |
| Texas Academy of Mathematics and Science | Denton | TX | 48 | 6 |
| Thomas Jefferson High School for Science and Technology | Alexandria | VA | 40 | 6 |
| Troy High School (California) | Fullerton | CA | 37 | 5 |
| Oak Ridge High School | Oak Ridge | TN | 35 | 12 |
| Troy High School (Michigan) | Troy | MI | 30 | 7 |
| The Harker School | San Jose | CA | 21 | 7 |
| Carmel High School | Carmel | IN | 21 | 3 |
| Lexington High School | Lexington | MA | 19 | 8 |
| Jericho High School | Jericho | NY | 18 | 5 |
| Ward Melville High School | East Setauket | NY | 18 | 4 |
| Hathaway Brown School | Shaker Heights | OH | 17 | 4 |
| Stuyvesant High School | New York | NY | 17 | 3 |
| Montgomery Blair High School | Silver Spring | MD | 15 | 4 |
| Monta Vista High School | Cupertino | CA | 14 | 3 |
| Illinois Math and Science Academy | Aurora | IL | 13 | 2 |
| Midwood High School | Brooklyn | NY | 13 | 0 |
| William G. Enloe High School | Raleigh | NC | 11 | 3 |

Regional Finalists by School Each Year
| School | 1999 | 2000 | 2001 | 2002 | 2003 | 2004 | 2005 | 2006 | 2007 | 2008 | 2009 | 2010 | 2011 | 2012 | 2013 | 2014 | 2015 | 2016 | 2017 |
|---|---|---|---|---|---|---|---|---|---|---|---|---|---|---|---|---|---|---|---|
| NCSSM | 0 | 3 | 5 | 10 | 8 | 10 | 1 | 5 | 2 | 2 | 5 | 1 | 2 | 0 | 3 | 1 | 2 | 3 | 2 |
| Troy (Fullerton) | 1 | 0 | 1 | 1 | 1 | 2 | 5 | 5 | 6 | 5 | 4 | 2 | 3 | 1 | 0 | 0 | 0 | 0 | 0 |
| Oak Ridge | 2 | 0 | 0 | 1 | 0 | 1 | 3 | 3 | 5 | 3 | 4 | 5 | 4 | 4 | 0 | 0 | 0 | 0 | 0 |
| TAMS | 0 | 3 | 1 | 0 | 1 | 0 | 2 | 2 | 4 | 2 | 4 | 5 | 5 | 2 | 2 | 7 | 3 | 1 | 4 |
| Thomas Jefferson | 0 | 0 | 0 | 1 | 1 | 0 | 0 | 0 | 1 | 2 | 2 | 2 | 4 | 4 | 6 | 3 | 5 | 5 | 4 |
| Troy (MI) | 0 | 3 | 0 | 0 | 0 | 0 | 1 | 1 | 1 | 0 | 2 | 2 | 3 | 0 | 5 | 6 | 0 | 3 | 3 |
| Hathaway Brown | 0 | 3 | 0 | 6 | 1 | 0 | 0 | 4 | 1 | 0 | 0 | 0 | 0 | 1 | 0 | 0 | 0 | 1 | 0 |
| Ward Melville | 1 | 1 | 0 | 1 | 1 | 1 | 0 | 2 | 1 | 0 | 3 | 4 | 0 | 0 | 0 | 1 | 1 | 1 | 0 |
| Jericho | 0 | 0 | 0 | 0 | 3 | 1 | 5 | 3 | 1 | 2 | 0 | 0 | 0 | 0 | 0 | 1 | 0 | 1 | 1 |
| Carmel | 0 | 0 | 0 | 0 | 0 | 1 | 0 | 2 | 0 | 2 | 3 | 2 | 3 | 1 | 1 | 1 | 2 | 3 | 0 |
| Stuyvesant | 4 | 0 | 0 | 0 | 1 | 0 | 0 | 0 | 1 | 1 | 1 | 2 | 1 | 2 | 2 | 1 | 0 | 1 | 0 |
| Lexington | 0 | 0 | 1 | 0 | 1 | 0 | 1 | 1 | 0 | 0 | 2 | 0 | 2 | 4 | 2 | 2 | 0 | 3 | 0 |
| Midwood | 4 | 4 | 1 | 0 | 0 | 2 | 0 | 0 | 0 | 0 | 0 | 0 | 0 | 2 | 0 | 0 | 0 | 0 | 0 |
| Montgomery Blair | 0 | 0 | 0 | 0 | 1 | 0 | 0 | 2 | 1 | 1 | 3 | 2 | 0 | 1 | 0 | 1 | 0 | 1 | 2 |
| Monta Vista | 0 | 0 | 0 | 0 | 0 | 0 | 3 | 0 | 2 | 2 | 0 | 2 | 2 | 0 | 0 | 0 | 0 | 2 | 1 |
| IMSA | 0 | 0 | 0 | 0 | 1 | 1 | 3 | 0 | 0 | 5 | 0 | 1 | 0 | 0 | 0 | 2 | 2 | 2 | 3 |
| William G. Enloe | 0 | 0 | 0 | 1 | 0 | 0 | 0 | 4 | 3 | 0 | 0 | 2 | 0 | 0 | 0 | 0 | 1 | 0 | 0 |
| Harker | 0 | 0 | 0 | 0 | 0 | 0 | 0 | 0 | 0 | 0 | 1 | 1 | 2 | 4 | 2 | 4 | 2 | 3 | 2 |

National Finalists by School Each Year
| School | 1999 | 2000 | 2001 | 2002 | 2003 | 2004 | 2005 | 2006 | 2007 | 2008 | 2009 | 2010 | 2011 | 2012 | 2013 | 2014 | 2015 | 2016 | 2017 |
|---|---|---|---|---|---|---|---|---|---|---|---|---|---|---|---|---|---|---|---|
| NCSSM | 0 | 3 | 0 | 2 | 2 | 3 | 0 | 2 | 0 | 2 | 1 | 0 | 0 | 0 | 0 | 0 | 0 | 0 | 0 |
| Oak Ridge | 2 | 0 | 0 | 0 | 0 | 0 | 3 | 3 | 0 | 0 | 0 | 0 | 2 | 2 | 0 | 0 | 0 | 0 | 0 |
| Troy (Fullerton) | 0 | 0 | 0 | 0 | 1 | 0 | 2 | 0 | 0 | 2 | 0 | 0 | 0 | 0 | 0 | 0 | 0 | 0 | 0 |
| TAMS | 0 | 0 | 1 | 0 | 0 | 0 | 1 | 0 | 0 | 1 | 1 | 0 | 1 | 0 | 0 | 0 | 0 | 1 | 0 |
| Troy (MI) | 0 | 0 | 0 | 0 | 0 | 0 | 1 | 0 | 1 | 0 | 0 | 0 | 3 | 0 | 0 | 2 | 0 | 0 | 0 |
| Lexington | 0 | 0 | 0 | 0 | 0 | 0 | 0 | 1 | 0 | 0 | 0 | 0 | 0 | 2 | 2 | 0 | 0 | 3 | 0 |
| Hathaway Brown | 0 | 1 | 0 | 0 | 0 | 0 | 0 | 3 | 0 | 0 | 0 | 0 | 0 | 0 | 0 | 0 | 0 | 0 | 0 |
| Ward Melville | 0 | 1 | 0 | 1 | 0 | 0 | 0 | 0 | 0 | 0 | 1 | 1 | 0 | 0 | 0 | 0 | 0 | 0 | 0 |
| Jericho | 0 | 0 | 0 | 0 | 3 | 1 | 0 | 0 | 0 | 0 | 0 | 0 | 0 | 0 | 0 | 1 | 0 | 0 | 0 |
| Thomas Jefferson | 0 | 0 | 0 | 0 | 0 | 0 | 0 | 0 | 1 | 0 | 1 | 1 | 0 | 0 | 0 | 0 | 1 | 1 | 1 |
| Carmel | 0 | 0 | 0 | 0 | 0 | 0 | 0 | 0 | 0 | 0 | 0 | 2 | 0 | 1 | 0 | 0 | 1 | 0 | 0 |
| Stuyvesant | 0 | 0 | 0 | 0 | 1 | 0 | 0 | 0 | 0 | 0 | 1 | 0 | 1 | 0 | 0 | 0 | 0 | 0 | 0 |
| Montgomery Blair | 0 | 0 | 0 | 0 | 0 | 0 | 0 | 0 | 0 | 0 | 0 | 2 | 0 | 1 | 0 | 0 | 0 | 0 | 1 |
| William G. Enloe | 0 | 0 | 0 | 0 | 0 | 0 | 0 | 0 | 3 | 0 | 0 | 0 | 0 | 0 | 0 | 0 | 0 | 0 | 0 |
| Harker | 0 | 0 | 0 | 0 | 0 | 0 | 0 | 0 | 0 | 0 | 0 | 0 | 0 | 0 | 2 | 0 | 2 | 1 | 2 |
| Monta Vista | 0 | 0 | 0 | 0 | 0 | 0 | 0 | 0 | 0 | 0 | 0 | 0 | 1 | 0 | 0 | 0 | 0 | 2 | 0 |
| Midwood | 0 | 0 | 0 | 0 | 0 | 0 | 0 | 0 | 0 | 0 | 0 | 0 | 0 | 0 | 0 | 0 | 0 | 0 | 0 |
| IMSA | 0 | 0 | 0 | 0 | 0 | 0 | 0 | 0 | 0 | 0 | 0 | 0 | 0 | 0 | 0 | 0 | 0 | 1 | 1 |
