= Angela Zhang (scientist) =

American scientist and student

- Born: 1994 (age 31–32); Cupertino, California, U.S.
- Education: Harvard College
- Scientific career
- Workplaces: Stanford University; Harvard College

Angela Zhang (born 1994) is an American scientist who in 2009, at the age of fourteen, began to research at Stanford University. By 2011, Zhang's research won the $100,000 Siemens Competition in Math, Science & Technology, and earned her widespread notability for her research on cancer treatments with iron oxide gold nanoparticles. She graduated from Harvard in 2016, and is now at Stanford University.

== Education ==
While attending Monta Vista High School, Zhang was reading doctorate papers on bio-engineering and attending scientific conferences; by the age of fourteen, she had begun to work as a member of Stanford's research team. In the fall of 2012, Zhang attended Harvard University, where she majored in biomedical engineering and graduated in 2016, after which she returned to Stanford University to participate in the 2016 Medical Scientist Training Program.

== Career and work ==
During high school, Zhang worked with a Stanford graduate student to research the cancer-fighting potential of a single nanoparticle. In 2011, at age sixteen, she entered her cancer-killing nanoparticle research into the Siemens Competition in Math, Science & Technology, where she won first prize and a $100,000 scholarship, and the Intel International Science and Engineering Fair, she also won first prize. She was the only female finalist in the Siemens competition that year. The following year, at the age of 17, Zhang went to the White House and presented her research to then-President Barack Obama.

As an undergraduate at Harvard, Zhang and a group of other Harvard students continued to grow her nonprofit "Labs on Wheels" concept, which she had started in 2012. It was made to provide refurbished laboratory equipment to American high schools. Labs on Wheels has garnered grants from Harvard and was the first place in the 2013 Harvard Undergraduate Women in Business Innovation Competition, and a finalist in the 2015 Harvard President's Challenge. Zhang presented the concept at the 2013 TEDxSan Jose.

== Major contribution ==
Zhang's research includes her exploration of the cancer-fighting potential of a single nanoparticle, which is known as the iron oxide gold nanoparticle. During her time at Stanford, while still in high school, Zhang and the team found that this particular nanoparticle is able to do two valuable things. It can detect cancer and the nanoparticle can deliver chemotherapy drugs more efficiently to the cells.
