= Mariangela Lisanti =

American theoretical physicist

- Born: September 2, 1983 (age 42)
- Education: Harvard University; Stanford University (PhD)
- Scientific career
- Fields: Particle phenomenology
- Workplaces: Princeton University
- Thesis: The Search for Dark Matter: From Colliders to Direct Detection Experiments (2010)
- Doctoral advisor: Jay Wacker
- Website: www.mariangelalisanti.com

Mariangela Lisanti (born September 2, 1983) is an American theoretical physicist and a professor of physics at Princeton University. Her work focuses on understanding dark matter and dark energy using tools developed through artificial intelligence.

== Biography ==
Mariangela Lisanti was born in 1983 to Anna and Anthony Lisanti, who had immigrated to the United States from Italy. She grew up in Pelham Gardens, a neighborhood in The Bronx, New York, and later attended Staples High School in Westport, Connecticut. In the summer after her junior year of high school, she completed an internship with Mark Reed, a professor of physics at Yale University. During her internship, she designed and built a device to measure single-atom conductance across a nanowire; the materials cost $35. She won the Siemens Competition national finals in 2000 with the device she built at Yale and her research on quantum mechanics. She went on to win first place in the 2001 Intel Science Talent Search. This made her the first student to win first place in both the Intel Science Talent Search and the Siemens Competition and she was included in the MIT Technology Review's TR35 list of the world's top under-35 innovators in 2002, when she was 18 years old.

Lisanti completed her bachelor's degree in condensed matter physics at Harvard University and earned a Ph.D. in high-energy physics at Stanford University. In 2010, she joined the Princeton University Center for Theoretical Science as an associate research scholar and became an assistant professor in 2013. Her best-known research has been on the phenomenology of collider physics. She has encouraged the use of simplified search strategy models in the observation of new particles from collider data, an approach that was consequently adopted by groups using the Large Hadron Collider. She has also described theoretical models concerning dark matter, and in 2014 she co-authored a paper predicting the times of year when dark matter particle density is greatest. She was a 2013 regional finalist in the Blavatnik Awards for Young Scientists. In May 2021, Lisanti and her team received funding from the Eric and Wendy Schmidt Transformative Technology Fund to build new tools using AI to support the search for new physical laws applying to dark matter and dark energy.
