= Vincent Dilorenzo =

English rugby league footballer

Personal information
- Full name: Dominic Vincent Dilorenzo
- Born: 14 October 1911 Warrington, England
- Died: 18 February 1989 (aged 77)

Playing information

Rugby league
- Position: Hooker
Club
Years	Team	Pld	T	G	FG	P
1931–34	Warrington	18	0	0	0	0
1934–≤46	Bradford Northern	c. 210
≤1940–≥40	→ Warrington (guest)
1945–46	→ Leeds (guest)	4
1946–49	St. Helens	10	0	0	0	0
	Total		0	0	0	0

Rugby union
- Position: Hooker
Representative
Years	Team	Pld	T	G	FG	P
≤1943–≥43	Cairo United Services	≥1

Domenico Vincent "Vin" Dilorenzo (14 October 1911 – 18 February 1989) was an English professional rugby league footballer who played in the 1930s and 1940s, and coach/scout/trainer of the 1940s through to the 1970s, and rugby union footballer who played in the 1940s. He played club level rugby league (RL) for Warrington (two spells, including the second as a World War II guest), Bradford Northern, Leeds (World War II guest) and St. Helens, as a hooker, and club level rugby union (RU) for Cairo United Services (during World War II), as a hooker and he was the coach/scout/trainer for Warrington Amateurs, Orford Tannery, and Warrington.

== Background ==
Vincent Dilorenzo was born in Warrington, Lancashire, England, he was a gunner during World War II, and he worked as a warehouseman for c. 25-years at the wire manufacturers and galvanizers; Whitecross Company, Milner Street, Warrington (subsequently acquired by Lancashire Steel Corporation, then British Steel, and then Rylands-Whitecross (jointly owned by Tinsley Wire Industries Ltd (TWIL), and British Ropes).

== Playing career ==
=== Championship final winners ===
Vincent Dilorenzo played hooker in Bradford Northern's 37–22 on aggregate victory over Swinton in the Championship Final during the 1939–40 season; the 21-13 first-leg victory at Station Road, Swinton on Saturday 18 May 1940, and the 16-9 second-leg victory at Odsal Stadium, Bradford on Saturday 25 May 1940.

=== Services rugby union ===
Vincent Dilorenzo played hooker in Cairo United Services' 3–28 defeat by the 6th Armoured Division (South Africa) (captained by future South Africa (Springboks) captain; Basil Kenyon) at Alamein Club, Cairo on Saturday 25 December 1943.

=== Club career ===
Vincent Dilorenzo made his début for Warrington on Saturday 19 March 1932, and he played his last match (in his second spell) for Warrington on Saturday 16 March 1940, he was transferred from Warrington to Bradford Northern, he played matches on loan from Bradford Northern to Warrington as a guest during World War II, he played 4-matches on loan from Bradford Northern to Leeds as a guest during World War II against; Swinton at Station Road, Swinton on Saturday 22 December 1945, Hunslet F.C. at Headingley, Leeds on Tuesday 25 December 1945, Bramley at Headingley, Leeds on Saturday 29 December 1945 and Salford at The Willows, Salford on Saturday 5 January 1946, he was transferred from Bradford Northern to St. Helens, he made his début for St. Helens in the 12–7 victory over Workington Town at Knowsley Road, St. Helens on Saturday 12 October 1946, and he played his last match for St. Helens in the 8–11 defeat by Swinton at Knowsley Road, St. Helens on Saturday 26 February 1949.

== Coaching career ==
=== Representative career ===
Vincent Dilorenzo was a trainer of Australia during the 1959–60 Kangaroo tour.
