= Angela Carlozzi Rossi =

American social worker (1901–1977)

- Born: Angela Carlozzi; 1901; Manhattan, New York
- Died: 1977 (aged 75–76); Brooklyn, New York
- Education: Temple University
- Known for: Social work

Angela Carlozzi Rossi (1901-1977) was an American social worker who worked for the Italian Welfare League from 1934 to 1973, serving as executive secretary and later as head of the Immigrant Aid Department. During that time, Rossi assisted thousands of Italian and other immigrants, including many who were interned at the Ellis Island immigration center during World War II.

When she began her career, it was unusual for Italian Americans to enter the field of social work. As the daughter of immigrants from Foggia, Italy, she was the first social worker with a "foreign background" to be hired by the Society for the Protection of Children in Philadelphia.

== Biography ==
She was born in Manhattan, New York City, in 1901, one of nine children. When she was four years old, the family moved to Brooklyn, where she grew up in a bustling household that also included two grandmothers. Her father was a Baptist, and the family belonged to the Italian Baptist Church in Williamsburg. She attended P.S. 143 and Eastern District High School. After moving to Philadelphia to take a job with the Society for the Protection of Children, she took courses at Temple University. As a social worker, she specialized in working with Italian immigrants, often acting as an interpreter for them.

In 1934, she moved back to New York to work for the Italian Welfare League. At the time, many Italians who had relatives in the United States were confused by the documentation requirements and entered the country illegally. In many cases, the head of a household was deported, leaving behind a wife and children who were legal U.S. residents or citizens. Rossi spent most of her time working with the broken families of deportees. During the 1930s and 40s it was especially difficult for the wives to find employment, and Rossi assisted them with applying for government relief. She also assisted those who were incarcerated on Ellis Island, providing them with necessities such as toothpaste and shaving supplies that the government did not provide. In many cases, according to Rossi, innocent people were needlessly detained for months at a time due to bureaucratic mixups. She also helped war brides, some of whom had come to the U.S. on the promise of marriage only to be abandoned by their fiancés. After the fascist regime in Italy passed antisemitic legislation, Rossi assisted Jewish refugees from Italy, and was criticized for it by some of her fellow Italian Americans. In 1956 she assisted survivors of the crash of the SS Andrea Doria.

As Rossi gained experience, she became responsible for overseeing most of the League's activities. Some of her papers are on file with the Center for Migration Studies of New York.
