= Italian Welfare League =

The Italian Welfare League is an American charitable organization founded in 1920 and incorporated in 1922 by Italian-American women. Its original purpose was to assist Italian veterans of World War I, and later, needy Italian residents of New York City. Today the League raises funds for a variety of charitable purposes, such as medical research.

== History ==
After World War I, a group of Italian-American women organized the Italian Committee of the American Red Cross. Originally its purpose was to assist the riservisti, veterans who had returned to the U.S. after fighting in the Italian army. It soon became clear that there was a general need for their services in the Italian neighborhoods in New York, where thousands of residents were mired in poverty, had little education, and were not fluent in English. To address these larger issues, the group met in May 1920 and formed the Italian Welfare League (IWL). Among the founding members were Margherita de Vecchi, Paola Berizzi, Elizabeth T. Bava, and Carolina Allen Perera, who served as the League's first president. Perera's husband, banker Lionello Perera, also played an important role in the founding of the female-dominated organization.

The IWL had offices in Manhattan, Brooklyn, and Ellis Island. At the Ellis Island office, they assisted Italians who were having trouble with immigration, including hundreds who were detained on the island during World War II. The league helped Italian New Yorkers find jobs, housing, and medical care, and provided emergency aid to the needy. In response to the Americanization Movement, they helped Italian immigrants learn to speak English and conform to the social norms of Anglo-Saxon Protestant America. From 1934 to 1973, executive secretary Angela Carlozzi Rossi oversaw much of the league's activity, in addition to handling many cases personally.

In 1945, league members created the Godparents Committee for Italian War Orphans, which provided food, clothing, money, and medicine for orphaned children in Italy. The following year they created a Port and Dock Committee to help Italian immigrants get through customs. The IWL also helped reunite family members who had been separated during the war. Since the 1960s, as the needs of Italian immigrants have become less pressing, the IWL has turned its attention to raising funds for medical research, hospitals, nursing homes, and scholarships to students seeking advanced degrees in social services.
