= Michael Viscardi =

American musician and mathematician

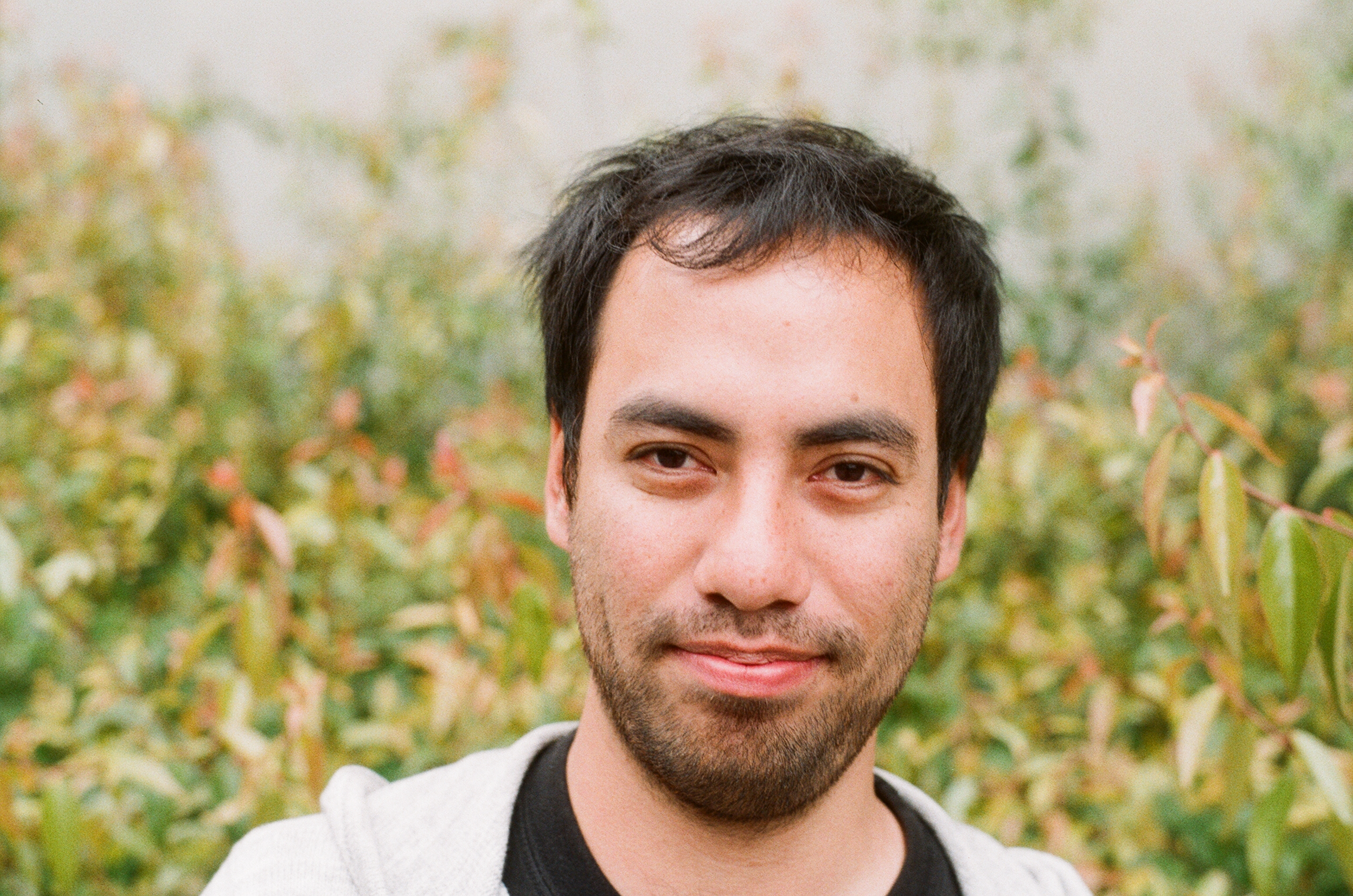
- Born: February 22, 1989 (age 37); Plano, Texas, United States
- Education: Harvard University; Massachusetts Institute of Technology
- Known for: Siemens Competition winner
- Awards: 2010 Hoopes Prize
- Scientific career
- Fields: Mathematics
- Doctoral advisor: Roman Bezrukavnikov
- Other academic advisors: Shing-Tung Yau; Joe Harris

Michael Anthony Viscardi (born February 22, 1989, in Plano, Texas) of San Diego, California, is an American mathematician who, as a highschooler, won the 2005 Siemens Competition and Davidson Fellowship with a mathematical project on the Dirichlet problem, whose applications include describing the flow of heat across a metal surface, winning $100,000 and $50,000 in scholarships, respectively. Viscardi's theorem is an expansion of the 19th-century work of Peter Gustav Lejeune Dirichlet. He was also named a finalist with the same project in the Intel Science Talent Search. Viscardi placed Best of Category in Mathematics at the International Science and Engineering Fair (ISEF) in May 2006. Viscardi also qualified for the United States of America Mathematical Olympiad and the Junior Science and Humanities Symposium.

== Life ==
Viscardi was homeschooled for high school, supplemented with mathematics classes at the University of California, San Diego. He is also a pianist and violinist, and onetime concertmaster of the San Diego Youth Symphony.

Viscardi is a member of the Harvard College class of 2010. He graduated summa cum laude from Harvard, receiving a 2010 Thomas T. Hoopes, Class of 1919, Prize, and earning the 2011 Morgan Prize honorable mention for his senior thesis "Alternate Compactifications of the Moduli Space of Genus One Maps". He worked as a postdoc at UC Berkeley from 2016 to 2018.

== Selected publication ==
- ———; Ebenfelt, Peter (2007), "An Explicit Solution to the Dirichlet Problem with Rational Holomorphic Data in Terms of a Riemann Mapping", Computational Methods and Function Theory, 7 (1): 127–140, doi:10.1007/BF03321636, S2CID 120812150.
