= Piero Scaruffi =

Italian-American writer

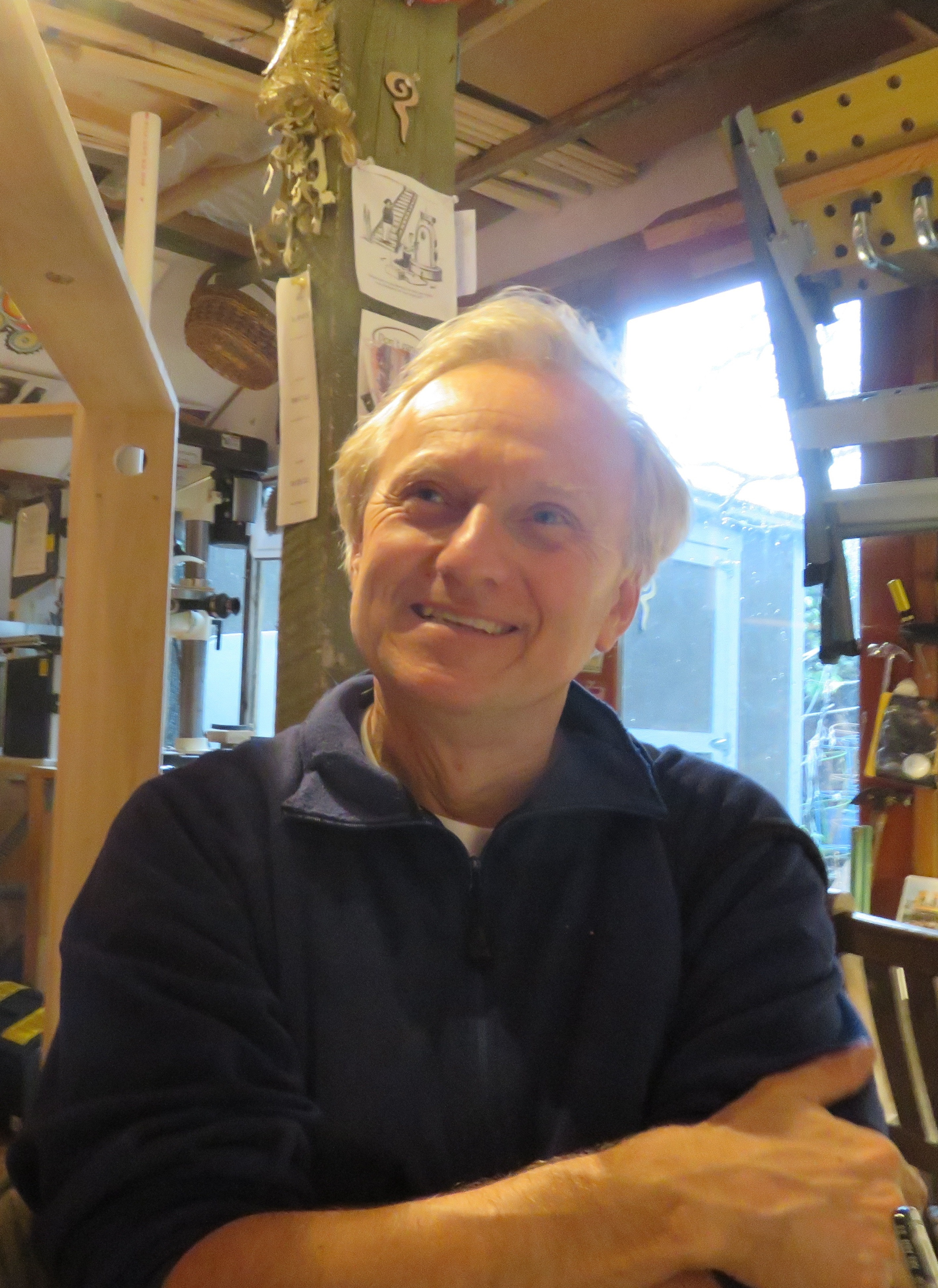
- Scaruffi in 2016
- Born: 1955 (age 70–71); Trivero, Biella, Italy
- Education: University of Turin
- Years active: 1983–present
- Known for: Science; music; arts; history; informatics
- Website: scaruffi.com

Piero Scaruffi (born 1955) is an Italian-American cognitive scientist, philosopher, cultural historian and writer who maintains a website on which his reviews of music, film, and art are published.

== Biography ==
=== Early life and education ===
Scaruffi was born in 1955 in Trivero, a comune in the Province of Biella of Italy. He graduated from the University of Turin with a degree in Mathematics.

=== Career ===
For a number of years he worked for Olivetti on artificial intelligence, as well as at Stanford University. He has been a visiting scholar at Harvard University and Stanford University (conducting research on Artificial Intelligence and Cognitive Science), lectured on "The Nature of Mind" and "History of Knowledge" (most recently at UC Berkeley), and published on artificial intelligence and cognitive science, including Thinking About Thought (2003) and The Nature of Consciousness (2006).

His work aims to bridge artificial intelligence, mathematics, science and art. As a software consultant, he worked on Internet applications, Artificial Intelligence and Object-Oriented design in Silicon Valley. He is an Italian-American, a naturalized U.S. citizen. He also writes about music. He published books about the history of rock music, jazz, avant garde music and modern popular music. One of them, A History of Rock and Dance Music, 1951–2008, spans 50 years of the genre. His writings on music are hosted online on his own website, scaruffi.com, and include a history of jazz and a history of modern classical music. The website, especially its music section, was the subject of an article in The New York Times by Dan Morrell on October 15, 2006. Morrell noted the "staggering" volume of Scaruffi's work, given that the site is "a one-man operation". From 2000 to 2003 he was a member of the Governing Board of Directors of the journal Leonardo.

Scaruffi chaired, among others, the Big Bang conference of June 2008 at UC Berkeley. He has compiled an extensive "Annotated Bibliography of Mind-Related Topics", as well. He has been running the Leonardo Art Science Evenings (LASERS) at the University of San Francisco and Stanford University, a series that he established in 2008 and as of 2022 spread to 50 universities worldwide. He also runs the interdisciplinary quarterly events SMMMASH at Stanford University. Scaruffi is involved in organising and moderating events for Stanford Continuing Studies.

== Bibliography ==
Books on music

- Le origini gli anni d'oro: 1954–1966. Milan: Arcana Editrice. 1989. ISBN 978-8-88-585938-8. (Volume 1 of Arcana's Storia del Rock series)
- Underground & progressive: 1967–1973. Milan: Arcana Editrice. 1989. ISBN 978-8-88-585939-5. (Volume 2 of Arcana's Storia del Rock series)
- Dal glam al punk: 1974–1980. Milan: Arcana Editrice. 1990. ISBN 978-8-88-585997-5. (Volume 3 of Arcana's Storia del Rock series)
- Anni '80 e oltre: 1981–1990. Milan: Arcana Editrice. 1990. ISBN 978-8-88-585995-1. (Volume 4 of Arcana's Storia del Rock series)
- Guida all'avanguardia e alla New Age. Milan: Arcana Editrice. 1991. ISBN 978-8-88-585967-8.
- Il nuovo rock americano degli anni '90. Milan: Arcana Editrice. 1994. ISBN 978-8-87-966055-6. (Volume 5 of Arcana's Storia del Rock series)
- Nuovi poeti rock americano. Padua: Arcana Editrice. 1994. ISBN 978-8-87-966030-3.
- Enciclopedia della musica New Age: elettronica, ambientale, pan-etnica. Padua: Arcana Editrice. 1996. ISBN 978-8-87-966073-0.
- Europa, Canada, Oceania e Giappone: gli anni '90. Padua: Arcana Editrice. 1997. ISBN 978-8-87-966076-1. (Volume 6 of Arcana's Storia del Rock series)
- A History of Rock Music: 1951–2000. New York: iUniverse. 2003. ISBN 0-595-29565-7.
- A History of Popular Music before Rock Music. Palo Alto: Omniware. 2007. ISBN 978-0-9765531-2-0.
- A History of Jazz Music: 1900–2000. Palo Alto: Omniware. 2007. ISBN 978-0-9765531-3-7.
- A History of Rock and Dance Music. Palo Alto: Omniware. 2009. ISBN 978-0-9765531-5-1. (Volume 1: 1951–1989)
- A History of Rock and Dance Music. Palo Alto: Omniware. 2009. ISBN 978-0-9765531-6-8. (Volume 2: 1990–2008)

Books on cognitive science and artificial intelligence

- L'Intelligenza artificiale: una guida per il programmatore. Padua: Franco Muzzio. 1987. ISBN 978-8-87-021422-2. (Volume 9 of Muzzio's Intelligenza Artificiale e Robotica series)
- La mente artificiale: realtà e prospettive della "macchina pensante". Milan: Angeli. 1991. ISBN 978-8-82-046805-7. (Volume 10 of Angeli's Prometheus series)
- La fabbrica del pensiero: nuove frontiere dell'intelligenza artificiale. Turn: La Stampa. 1996. ISBN 978-8-87-783080-7.
- Thinking about Thought: A Primer on the New Science of Mind. New York: Writers Club Press. 2003. ISBN 978-0-595-26420-9.
- The Nature of Consciousness: The Structure of Life and the Meaning of Matter. Palo Alto: Omniware. 2006. ISBN 978-0-9765531-1-3.
- Intelligence Is Not Artificial. Palo Alto: Omniware. 2013. ISBN 978-0-9765531-9-9.
- Thinking about Thought. Seattle: Createspace. 2015. ISBN 978-1-5033-6106-5.
- Intelligence Is Not Artificial – Expanded edition. Seattle: Createspace. 2018. ISBN 978-1-984101-45-7.
- Humankind 2.0. Beijing: Citic. 2017. ISBN 978-7-5086-7176-5.

Other books

- Il terzo secolo: almanacco della società americana alla fine del millenio. Milan: Feltrinelli. 1996. ISBN 978-8-80-781367-2. (Volume 1367 of Feltrinelli's Universale economico series)
- Synthesis: Essays, Photographs, Poems. Palo Alto: Omniware. 2009. ISBN 978-0-9765531-7-5.
- A History of Silicon Valley: The Largest Creation of Wealth in the History of the Planet. Palo Alto: Omniware. 2011. ISBN 978-0-9765531-8-2. (co-authored with Arun Rao)
- A Brief History of Knowledge: From 3000 BC to the 21st Century. CreateSpace. 2014. ISBN 978-1-5005-2665-8.
- A History of Silicon Valley: Third Edition. Seattle: Createspace. 2016. ISBN 978-1-5087-5873-0.
- 100 Years of Silicon Valley. Beijing: PT. 2017. ISBN 978-7-115-42996-4.
