= Rick Francona =

American writer and military analyst (born 1951)

Richard Carmon Francona
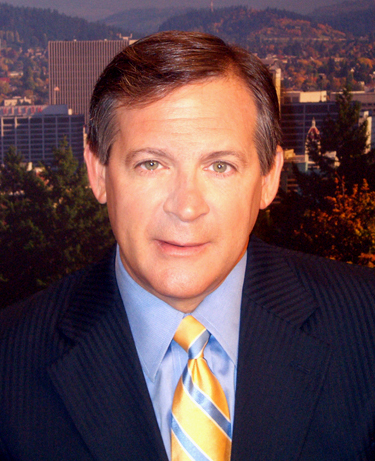
- Francona in 2008
- Born: August 31, 1951 (age 75); New Brighton, Pennsylvania, U.S.
- Military career
- Allegiance: United States of America
- Branch: United States Air Force
- Service years: 1970–1998
- Rank: Lieutenant colonel
- Nickname: "Rick"
- Units: Defense Intelligence Agency; National Security Agency; Central Intelligence Agency
- Conflicts: Vietnam War; Gulf War; Yugoslav Wars
- Awards: Defense Distinguished Service Medal; Defense Superior Service Medal; Bronze Star; Air Medal (9)
- Other work: NBC/MSNBC/CNBC military analyst

Rick Francona (born August 31, 1951) is an author, commentator and media military analyst. He is a retired United States Air Force intelligence officer with experience in the Middle East, including tours of duty with the National Security Agency, the Defense Intelligence Agency and the Central Intelligence Agency. He was under contract to NBC News and appeared regularly on NBC, MSNBC and CNBC, as well as Radio Canada and other media. In 2013, he became a military analyst for CNN.

== Background ==
Francona served for over 27 years in the U.S. Air Force, most of it in the Middle East. Fluent in Arabic, he served in the region with the National Security Agency, the Defense Intelligence Agency and the Central Intelligence Agency. He has a bachelor's degree from Chapman College (now Chapman University) in Government and the Arabic language, and a master's degree from Troy State University in International Relations with a concentration in Middle East studies. He is a cousin of the current Cincinnati Reds manager Terry Francona.

Francona and his wife Emily, also a retired Air Force intelligence officer, reside in Port Orford, Oregon.

== Military service ==
Francona enlisted in the United States Air Force in 1970, and served as a Vietnamese linguist until 1973, conducting combat aerial reconnaissance missions over Vietnam and Laos in a variety of strategic and tactical aircraft. After Arabic language training, he served at a variety of locations in the Middle East from 1975 to 1977, and supported the evacuation of the U.S. Embassy in Beirut, Lebanon in 1976. In 1978, he became an Arabic language instructor at the Defense Language Institute in Monterey, California.

Following his commissioning in 1979, Francona was an instructor at the Air Force Intelligence School in Denver, Colorado. From 1982 to 1984, he was a Middle East operations officer with the National Security Agency in the United States and overseas. In 1984, he was assigned as an advisor to the Royal Jordanian Air Force in Amman, Jordan.

In 1987, he was assigned to the Defense Intelligence Agency as the assistant defense intelligence officer for the Middle East. During this assignment, he spent much of 1987 and 1988 at the U.S. Embassy in Baghdad, Iraq, as a liaison officer to the Iraqi armed forces Directorate of Military Intelligence. Francona worked an observer of Iraqi combat operations against Iranian forces, and flew sorties with the Iraqi Air Force. His observations were key to the discovery of Iraqi chemical weapons capabilities and ballistic missile modifications. Immediately following the Iraqi invasion of Kuwait in August 1990 and through the Gulf War, Francona was deployed to the Gulf as an interpreter and advisor on Iraqi armed forces to commander in chief of the U.S. Central Command, General Norman Schwarzkopf, Jr. As such, he was the lead interpreter for ceasefire talks with the Iraqi military at Safwan, Iraq, in March 1991.

After the end of the Gulf War, Francona served in the Office of the Secretary of Defense, and was a principal author of the Department of Defense report to Congress on the conduct of the Gulf war. In 1992, he was selected to be the first air attaché to the U.S. Embassy in Damascus, Syria, returning to the United States in 1995.

From 1995 to 1996, Francona served with the CIA, and participated in a variety of sensitive operations in the Middle East. During one of these operations, he survived an attempt on his life by Iraqi Intelligence Service agents. He was later awarded the CIA Bronze Seal Medallion for his service to the CIA.

In 1996, he was selected to lead the development of a Joint Services counterterrorism intelligence branch. As a direct result of the success in creating this special Task Force, he was asked to lead a special operations team supporting NATO forces in Bosnia in late 1997. He returned to the United States and retired from active duty in 1998.

== Commentary ==
Francona is a media analyst on Middle East political-military events, formerly under contract to NBC News and appeared regularly on NBC Nightly News, the Today Show, MSNBC, Hardball with Chris Matthews, Scarborough Country, Countdown with Keith Olbermann, and others. He also writes articles for MSNBC, the Council on Foreign Relations, and his blog at Middle East Perspectives. He frequently speaks to conventions and public service audiences.

In 2010, Francona appeared as a subject matter expert on the Iraqi military and Saddam Hussein in an episode of Spike TV's "Who is the Deadliest Warrior." In 2013, he began working as a military analyst for CNN, commenting on the Syrian civil war and chemical warfare issues, and in 2014 on the deteriorating situation in Iraq.

== Pentagon military analyst program ==
In April 2008, documents obtained by New York Times reporter David Barstow revealed that Francona had been recruited as one of over 75 retired military officers involved in the Pentagon military analyst program. Participants appeared on television and radio news shows as military analysts, and/or penned newspaper op-ed columns. The program was launched in early 2002 by then-Assistant Secretary of Defense for Public Affairs Victoria Clarke. The idea was to recruit "key influentials" to help sell a wary public on "a possible Iraq invasion."
