= Edward J. Giorgianni =

American imaging scientist (1944–2025)

- Born: June 3, 1944
- Died: July 4, 2025 (aged 81); Rochester, NY
- Occupation: Image Engineer
- Spouse: Jane Sharp Giorgianni
- Children: David Giorgianni
- Parent(s): Anthony and Olga Giorgianni

Edward J. Giorgianni (1944 – 2025) was an Imaging Scientist formerly of the Imaging Research and Advanced Development Division at Eastman Kodak Company

== Biography ==
Giorgianni was best known for his contributions in the field of color science and hold numerous patents in the fields of color management and imaging technology. Among his inventions are the digital color-encoding methods used on many commercial imaging systems, including the Photo CD System. Giorgianni was a co-author of Digital Color Management Encoding Solutions, which he wrote with Thomas E. Madden. The text contains a foreword by another noted color scientist and author of The Reproduction of Colour, R. W. G. Hunt. In addition, Giorgianni was an instructor and frequent lecturer at technical symposia and universities.

Giorgianni retired from the Eastman Kodak Company in 2005.

=== Marriage and children ===
- Married to Jane Sharp Giorgianni.
- Son David Giorgianni.

=== Death ===
Ed Giorgianni died on July 4, 2025.

== Published works ==
Digital Color Management Encoding Solutions

== Recognition ==
Academy Science and Technical Award for the Cineon Digital File System in 2013.
