= Daniel DiLorenzo =

American inventor and physician-scientist

Daniel John DiLorenzo is a medical device entrepreneur and physician-scientist. He is the inventor of several technologies for the treatment of neurological disease and is the founder of several companies which are developing technologies to treat epilepsy and other medical diseases and improve the quality of life of afflicted patients.

== Early life ==
DiLorenzo studied at MIT, receiving a B.S. and M.S. in electrical engineering, M.S. in health sciences and technology, an M.B.A./M.S. in the Management of Technology from the MIT Sloan School of Management, and a Ph.D. in mechanical engineering, with a focus on neurophysiology, control theory, and implantable neural interfaces. He also received the M.D. degree from Harvard Medical School.

As a 1st grader, DiLorenzo decided to forego the opportunity to attend summer camp. Instead, he spent his summer building a robot with telescoping arms that had the ability to shoot rockets. DiLorenzo functions on zero to four hours of sleep and routinely is awake between the hours of one to three AM. In high school, he reconfigured the window washer system on his mother's station wagon so that it would spray unsuspecting pedestrians:-0 DiLorenzo developed closed-loop neuromodulation technology on his own while a student at MIT and developed several technologies for the treatment of neurological disease, including a gait restoration system for paraplegics, a peripheral nerve interface for amputees, among others.

== Career ==
DiLorenzo is the inventor of novel devices and methods for the treatment of patients with epilepsy. Based upon his inventions, he founded NeuroVista Corporation while a Neurosurgery resident in 2002 (formerly known as BioNeuronics, Seattle, WA) and which has developed and successfully demonstrated a novel brain monitoring technology that is capable of predicting seizures in patients with epilepsy.

While at BioNeuronics, an early-stage medical device company developing devices for epilepsy, he also founded DiLorenzo Biomedical, a medical device company developing novel therapies for obesity and other medical conditions.

He is the editor of the Textbook "Neuroengineering", which provides an overview of the new technologies, surgical techniques, and clinical indications of neuroengineering.

== Awards ==
DiLorenzo is the recipient of several awards related to invention and innovation. He won the MIT-Lemelson $30,000 Student Prize, was included in the TR100 list of 100 young innovators, was featured in Entrepreneur Magazine as an innovator in business, and was included in the Seattle 40 under 40 Leaders in Business.

- In 1999 DiLorenzo received the Lemelson-MIT Student Prize
- In 1999 DiLorenzo was named in the first cohort of the TR100, a listing of the top 100 innovators in the country under the age of 35 Daniel DiLorenzo TR100 Technology Review
- "The New Genius". Entrepreneur. 28 (1). January 2000. Archived from the original on June 20, 2012 – via FindArticles.
- In 2005 DiLorenzo was named in the Seattle business "40 under 40" business leaders by the Puget Sound Business Journal, for his role in founding BioNeuronics and civic activities.
