= Dipper (disambiguation) =

A dipper is a passerine bird in the genus Cinclus

Dipper may also refer to:

== Dipping objects ==
- Dipper (spoon), a utensil for dipping liquids
- Honey dipper, a wooden utensil with deep grooves for drizzling honey on breadstuff
- Part of a steam shovel, power shovel or backhoe which carries the bucket
- Dipper (container), a container for oil for painting
- Grid dip oscillator or dipper, a resonance frequency measuring instrument
- Dipper well, a perpetual-flow sink often used in coffeehouses and ice cream shops

== Military, aviation ==
- HMS Dipper, former name of the airfield RNAS Henstridge , Somerset, England
- USS Dipper (AM-357), an American World War II minesweeper
- Collins Dipper, American flying boat by Collins Aero

== People ==
- Robert DiPierdomenico (born 1958), Australian rules footballer and media personality nicknamed Dipper
- Alf Dipper (1885–1945), English cricketer

== Other uses ==
- Dippers (book), a 1997 children's book by Barbara Nichol and Barry Moser
- Dipper (Chinese constellation)
- An old colloquial term for the New Democratic Party, a Canadian political party
- Dipper Pines, a character on the Disney Channel animated series Gravity Falls
- Dipper star, a class of variable stars
- Dipper (brand), an Indian condom brand

== See also ==
- Big Dipper (disambiguation)
- Little Dipper (disambiguation)
