= Crown Fountain =

Artwork by Jaume Plensa in Chicago

Coordinates: 41°52′53.34″N 87°37′25.44″W

- Crown Fountain spouting water on visitors
- Artist: Jaume Plensa
- Year: 2004
- Type: black granite reflecting pool dual LED screen, glass brick sculptures
- Dimensions: 15 m (50 ft)
- Location: Millennium Park, Chicago, Illinois

Crown Fountain (sometimes known as the "Squirting Faces") is an interactive work of public art and video sculpture featured in Chicago's Millennium Park, which is located in the Loop community area. Designed by Spanish artist Jaume Plensa and executed by Krueck and Sexton Architects, it opened in July 2004. The fountain is composed of a black granite reflecting pool placed between a pair of glass brick towers. The towers are 50 feet (15.2 m) tall, and they use light-emitting diodes (LEDs) to display digital videos on their inward faces. Construction and design of the Crown Fountain cost $17 million. The water operates from May to October, intermittently cascading down the two towers and spouting through a nozzle on each tower's front face.

Residents and critics have praised the fountain for its artistic and entertainment features. It highlights Plensa's themes of dualism, light, and water, extending the use of video technology from his prior works. Its use of water is unique among Chicago's many fountains, in that it promotes physical interaction between the public and the water. Both the fountain and Millennium Park are highly accessible because of their universal design.

Crown Fountain has been one of the most controversial of all the Millennium Park features. Before it was even built, some were concerned that the sculpture's height violated the aesthetic tradition of the park. After construction, surveillance cameras were installed atop the fountain, which led to a public outcry (and their quick removal).

However, the fountain has survived its contentious beginnings to find its way into Chicago pop culture. It is a popular subject for photographers and a common gathering place. While some of the videos displayed are of scenery, most attention has focused on its video clips of local residents. The fountain is a public play area and offers people an escape from summer heat, allowing children to frolic in the fountain's water.

== Concept and design ==
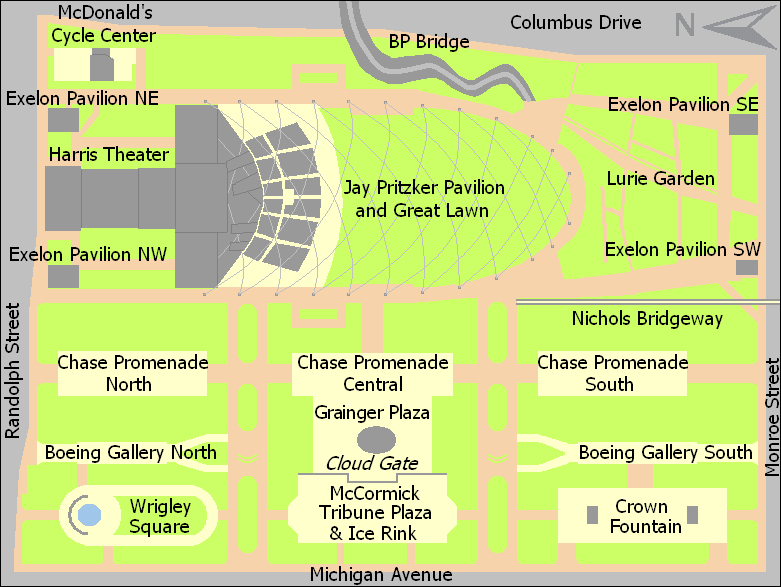
Image map of Millennium Park; east is at the top. Each feature or label is linked.

Grant Park, which is between Lake Michigan and the central business district, is commonly called "Chicago's Front Yard". Its northwest corner had been Illinois Central rail yards and parking lots until 1997, when it was made available for development by the city as Millennium Park. Millennium Park was conceived in 1998 as the capstone of Grant Park, to celebrate the new millennium and to feature world-renowned architects, artists, designers, landscape architects, and urban planners. As of 2007, Millennium Park trails only Navy Pier as a Chicago tourist attraction.

=== Selection of artist ===
In December 1999, Lester Crown and his family agreed to sponsor a water feature in Millennium Park. Unlike other park feature sponsors, the Crowns acted independently of Millennium Park officials; they conducted independent surveys of water technologies, held their own informal design contest, and stayed active in the design and engineering of the project.

The Crowns were open-minded about the choice of artist; wanting a modern work, they solicited proposals from a list of prospective artists and architects. Jaume Plensa researched the traditions and history of fountains and studied anthropomorphism in fountain imagery. Some of his early ideas for the project referenced Buckingham Fountain, but these were soon abandoned. His presentation to the Crown family started with a slide show of fountains from the Middle Ages through the 20th century. Plensa focused on the philosophical meanings associated with fountains, their history, use and art. His presentation included computer animation of facial expressions. The other finalists were Maya Lin, who presented a low-height horizontal form, and Robert Venturi, who presented a fountain that would have been 150 feet (46 m) tall. In January 2000, Plensa won the commission to design the fountain over Lin and Venturi. The installation is a video sculpture, commissioned to operate thirty years.

=== Artistic design ===
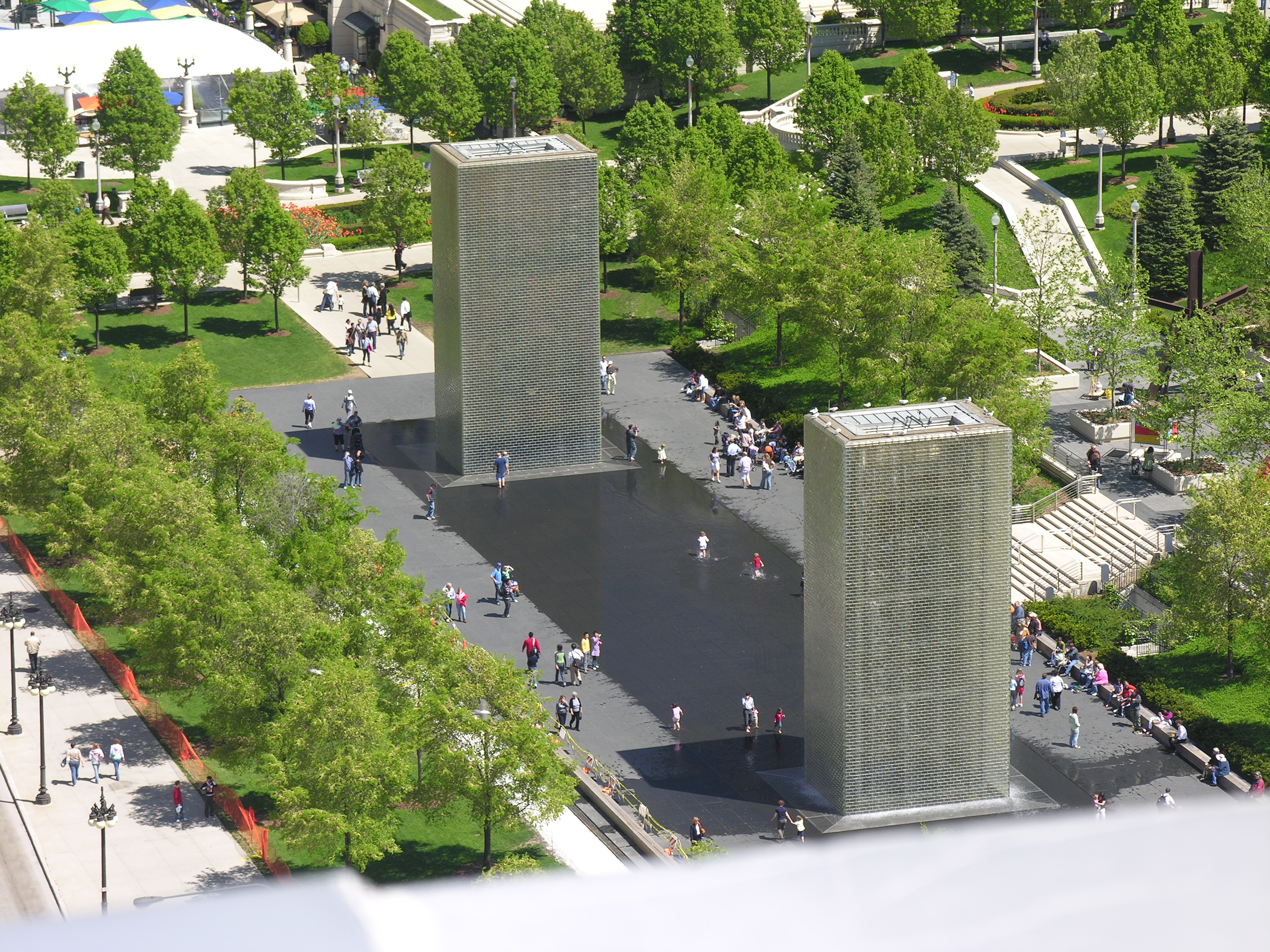
Opposing 50-foot (15 m) towers represent Plensa's dualism theme.

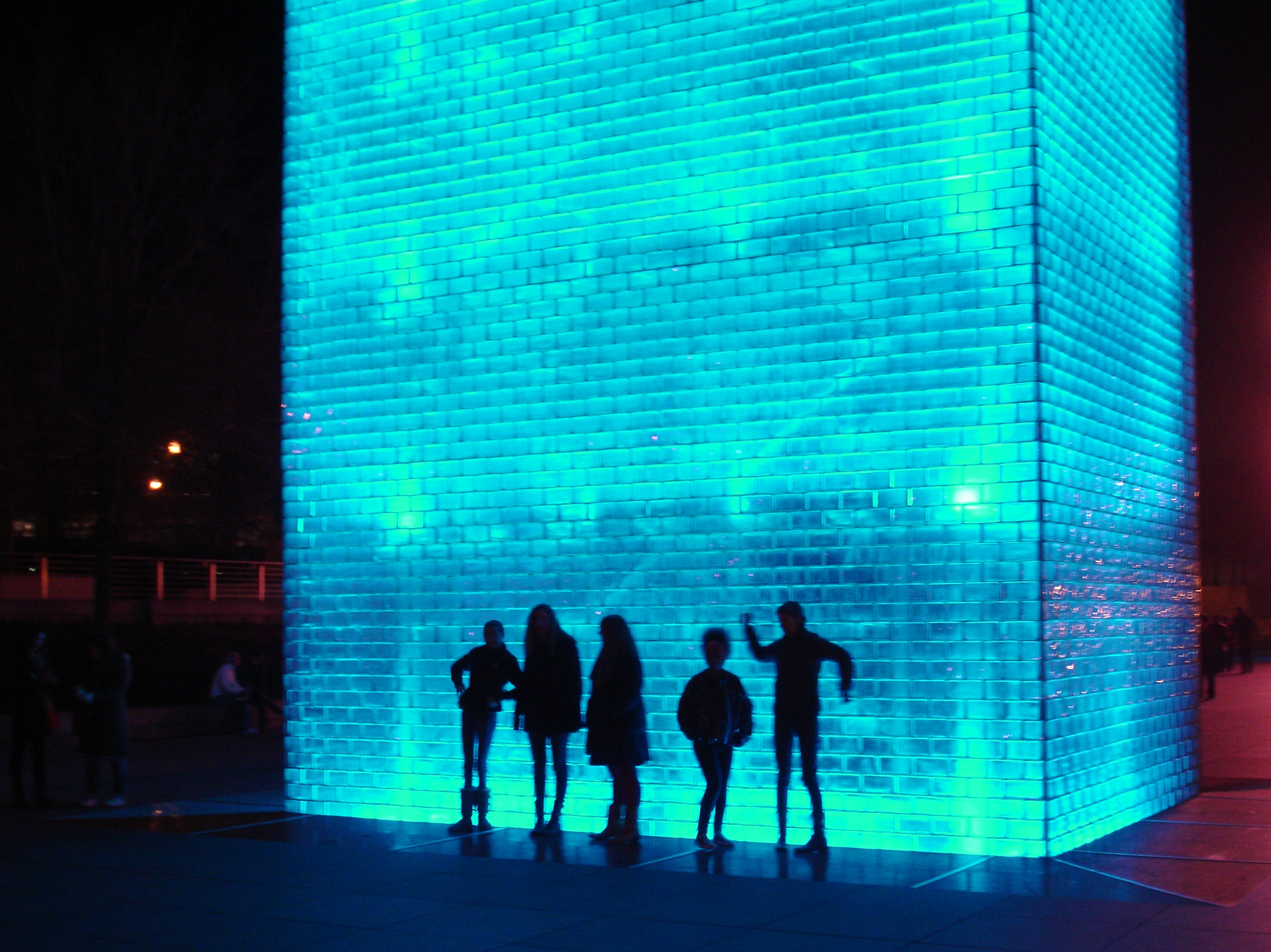
Tourists often interact with the fountain by silhouetting themselves against the fountain's lighting at night.

Prior to Crown Fountain, Plensa's dominant theme had been dualism, which he had expanded to artworks in which the viewers are outside, and the visible subjects of the art are inside containers and hollow spaces. In the 1990s, he completed several outdoor sculptures in which he explored the use of light (The Star of David (1998) at Stockholm's Raoul Wallenberg Square, Bridge of Light (1998) in Jerusalem), and LED technology, video, and computer design (Gläserne Seele & Mr. Net in Brandenburg (1999–2000)). In his public art, Plensa challenged himself to involve the viewer with his art, which led to his conception of the Crown Fountain. His objective was to create a socially relevant, interactive fountain for the 21st century. Since water is the focus of a fountain, and since Chicago, and especially Millennium Park, is so greatly affected by the nearby waterfront, Plensa sought to create an eternal water work to complement the local natural inspirations. Because of the colder winters common to the climate of Chicago, Plensa created a fountain that would remain vibrant when the water was inactive in the wintertime, so the fountain is an experience of light themes and the use of video technology.

Plensa explores dualism with Crown Fountain, where he has two randomly selected faces "conversing" with each other. Plensa feels that by using faces, he can represent the diversity of the city both in ethnicity and in age. The artist intends to portray the sociocultural evolution of the city by updating the collection of images. His representation has become a part of the city's pop culture; the first few episodes of the first season of Prison Break featured shots of the fountain.

Plensa feels that the challenge in the creation of successful work of public art is to integrate the viewer into an interactive relationship with the art. The fountain is known for encouraging its visitors to splash and slide in the reflecting pool, jostle for position under the water spout and place themselves under the cascade. This interactivity was to some degree accidental. Although the city planned for some interactivity, the transformation of the fountain into a water park for kids within hours of opening surprised Plensa. Now, when the National Weather Service issues summer heat advisories and the Governor of Illinois declares state office buildings as official daytime cooling centers, the national press points to Crown Fountain as a respite for inhabitants of the Chicago metropolitan area.

=== Video production ===
Approximately 75 ethnic, social, and religious Chicago organizations were asked to provide candidates whose faces would be photographed for integration into the fountain. The subjects were chosen from local schools, churches and community groups, and filming began in 2001 at the downtown campus of the School of the Art Institute of Chicago (SAIC). The SAIC students filmed their subjects with a $100,000 high-definition HDW-F900 video camera, the same model used in the production of the three Star Wars prequels. About 20 SAIC students took part in what became an informal master's course in public art for the project. Faculty from Columbia College Chicago was also involved in the production of the video. The high-definition equipment was used because of the scale of the project. Because the image proportions were like a movie screen with a width far exceeding its height, the camera was turned on its side during filming.

Each face appears on the sculpture for a total of 5 minutes using various parts of individual 80-second videos. A 40-second section is played at one-third speed forward and backward, running for a total of 4 minutes. Then, there is a subsequent segment, where the mouth is puckering, that is stretched to 15 seconds. This is followed by a section, in which the water appears to spout from the open mouth, that is stretched to last for 30 seconds. Finally, there is a smile after the completion of the water spouting from the mouth, that is slowed to extend for 15 seconds. Of the original 1,051 subjects filmed, 960 videos were determined to be usable for the project. Originally, the set of images was presumed to be the beginning of a work in progress, but as of 2009 no additional videos are planned.

To achieve the effect in which water appears to be flowing from subjects' mouths, each video has a segment where the subject's lips are puckered, which is then timed to correspond to the spouting water, reminiscent of gargoyle fountains. Each face is cropped so that no hair and usually no ears are visible. Since there is no tripod designed for cameras turned on their sides, an adjustable barber/dentist's chair was used to minimize the need for the movement of the state-of-the-art camera during filming. Nonetheless, in some case, digital manipulation was necessary to properly simulate puckering in the exact proper location on the video. Many of the faces had to be stretched in order to get the mouths properly positioned. Additionally, each video was color-corrected for brightness, contrast and color saturation. Both the playback equipment and the final videos had to be further adjusted to account for sunlight during viewing.

== Construction and engineering ==
The Crown family, for whom the fountain is named, donated $10 million of the $17 million construction and design cost. The Goodman family, known for funding the Goodman Theatre, was also a large contributor; the entire $17 million cost was provided by private donations. The initial proposed cost for the fountain had been $15 million.

After two architectural firms refused the contract to make Plensa's design a reality, the firm Krueck + Sexton Architects accepted. Public art was a departure from Krueck & Sexton's residential and corporate office-dominated portfolio, which includes buildings like the Spertus Institute. Collaboration between the artist, architectural team, and consultants proved to be crucial to the success of the project. The fountain's black granite reflecting pool measures 48 by 232 feet (15 by 71 m) and has an approximate water depth of 0.25 inches (6.4 mm). It displays videos on two LED screens, each encapsulated in a glass brick tower measuring 50 by 23 by 16 feet (15.2 by 7.0 by 4.9 m).

=== Glass blocks ===
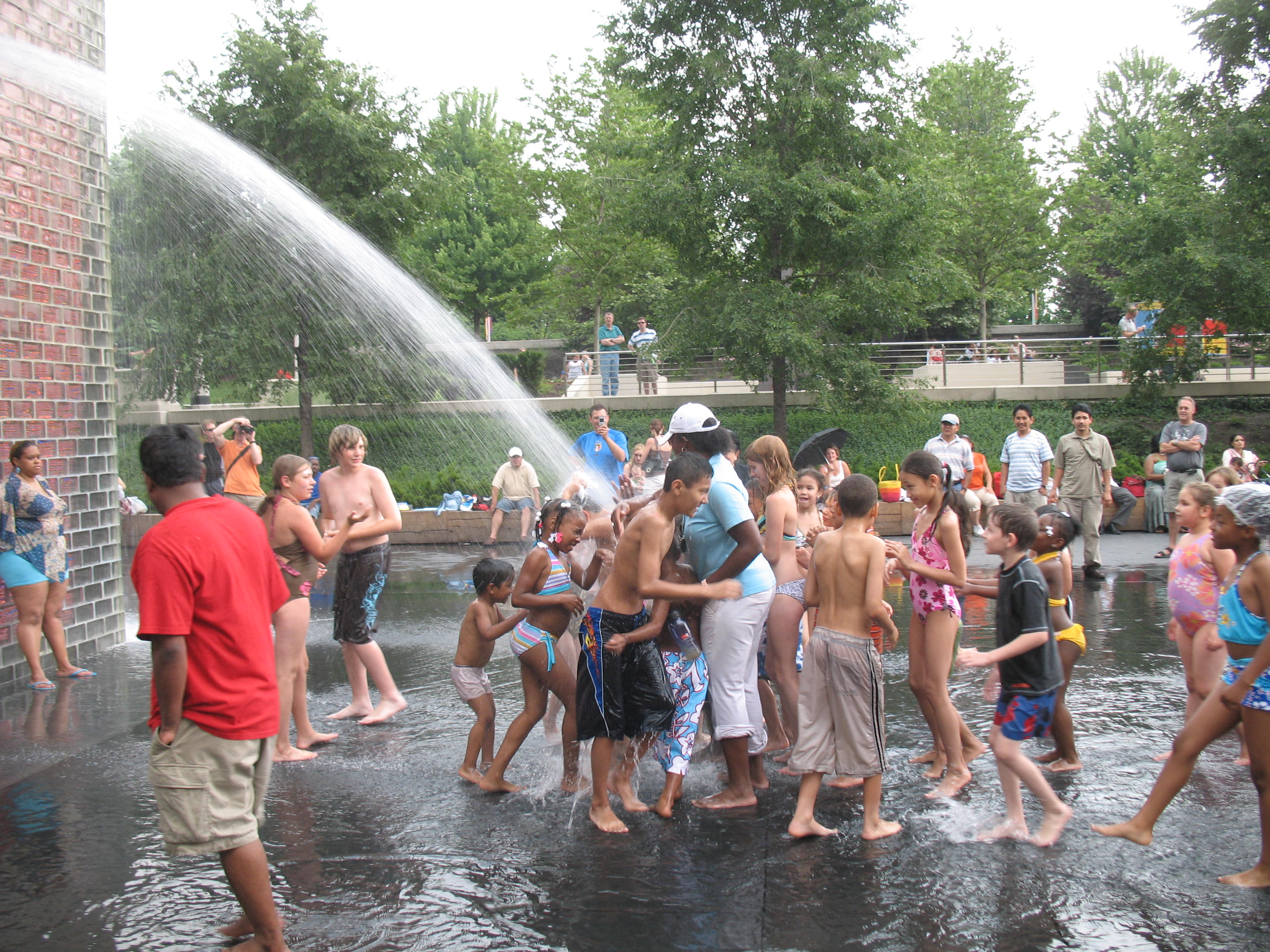
The waterfall and the spout are popular attractions.

After several dozen glass manufacturing firms were interviewed, L. E. Smith Glass Company emerged as the company to produce 22,500 glass blocks near the upper limit of the size of press glass formed from hand-poured molten glass and cast iron molds. The process used sand and soda ash heated to a temperature of 2,600 °F (1,430 °C) and "gathered" with a large clay ball resembling a honey dipper. Rather than use a standard plunger to ensure the glass that sagged off the rod spread to the corners of the mold, they relied on gravity. The full mold was annealed (reheated in an oven to 1,100 °F (593 °C)) and cooled. Over the course of four months of production, about 350 blocks were produced per day.

The glass was custom-made at a factory in Mount Pleasant, Pennsylvania, and shipped to the structural glass panel manufacturer in Melbourne, Florida. The panels were then shipped by truck to Chicago. The glass is white glass, rather than the usual green glass that results from iron impurities. This has the tradeoff of increased image clarity, but greater dirt visibility. Each block is 5 by 10 by 2 inches (127 by 254 by 51 mm) with glass thin enough to avoid image distortion. On each block, one of the six faces is polished, and the other five surfaces are textured.

The structure for the blocks was a challenge. At first, the design team had considered switching to plastic blocks, until the team found Circle Redmont Inc., a prefabricated glass panel company in Melbourne, Florida which specializes in structural glass panel systems. Circle Redmont came up with the plan of turning grates on their sides to be used as building elements. The individual grids are 5 feet (1.5 m) tall and either 16 feet (4.9 m) or 23 feet (7.0 m) wide with cell capacity of an average of 250 blocks. Each tower is composed of 44 grids stacked and welded. The combination of the refraction of the glass and the thinness of the metal make the grid virtually invisible.

Krueck + Sexton designed a special stainless steel T-frame both to bear the load of the walls, which are 50 feet (15 m) high, and to withstand lateral wind forces. The frame holds all the glass blocks and transfers the load to the base in a zigzag pattern. Rods measuring 0.5 inches (13 mm) in diameter anchor to the structure and project into the frame for lateral stability, while triangular corner brackets add support.

=== Fountain ===
The fountain uses 11,000 imperial gallons (50,000 L) per hour, 97% of which is recycled back into the system. Getting the water to the spout took ingenuity. Although consideration was given to omitting a LED tile, it was determined that the images would then look as though they were each missing a tooth. Instead, one tile in each tower is recessed about 6 inches (150 mm) to allow the installation of 1 inch (25 mm) clear tubing for the water nozzle. The water regularly spills over the fountain and down the sides of the towers and intermittently spouts from the nozzle. Two essential custom fittings contribute to the artistic vision of the fountain: a custom glass block at the upper edge for guiding the water's descent while remaining unobtrusive, and a plastic nozzle fitted to the stainless steel frame to control the rate of water flow and reduce liability to the city for any injuries sustained by the fountain's interactive participants. The interactive participants are usually children playing in the stream from the water spout or under the cascade. The risk that the spouting water would knock people down made the design both a legal and a physical challenge.

The 9,423-square-foot (875.4 m^{2}) pool used 3 by 3 feet (0.91 by 0.91 m) pavers that weigh 250 pounds (110 kg). The pavers were rested on screw jack pedestals in order to be leveled and shimmed. The pavers had to be perfectly leveled for the water to work correctly because the fountain incorporates numerous sensors to regulate the flow and level of the water.

==== LEDs ====
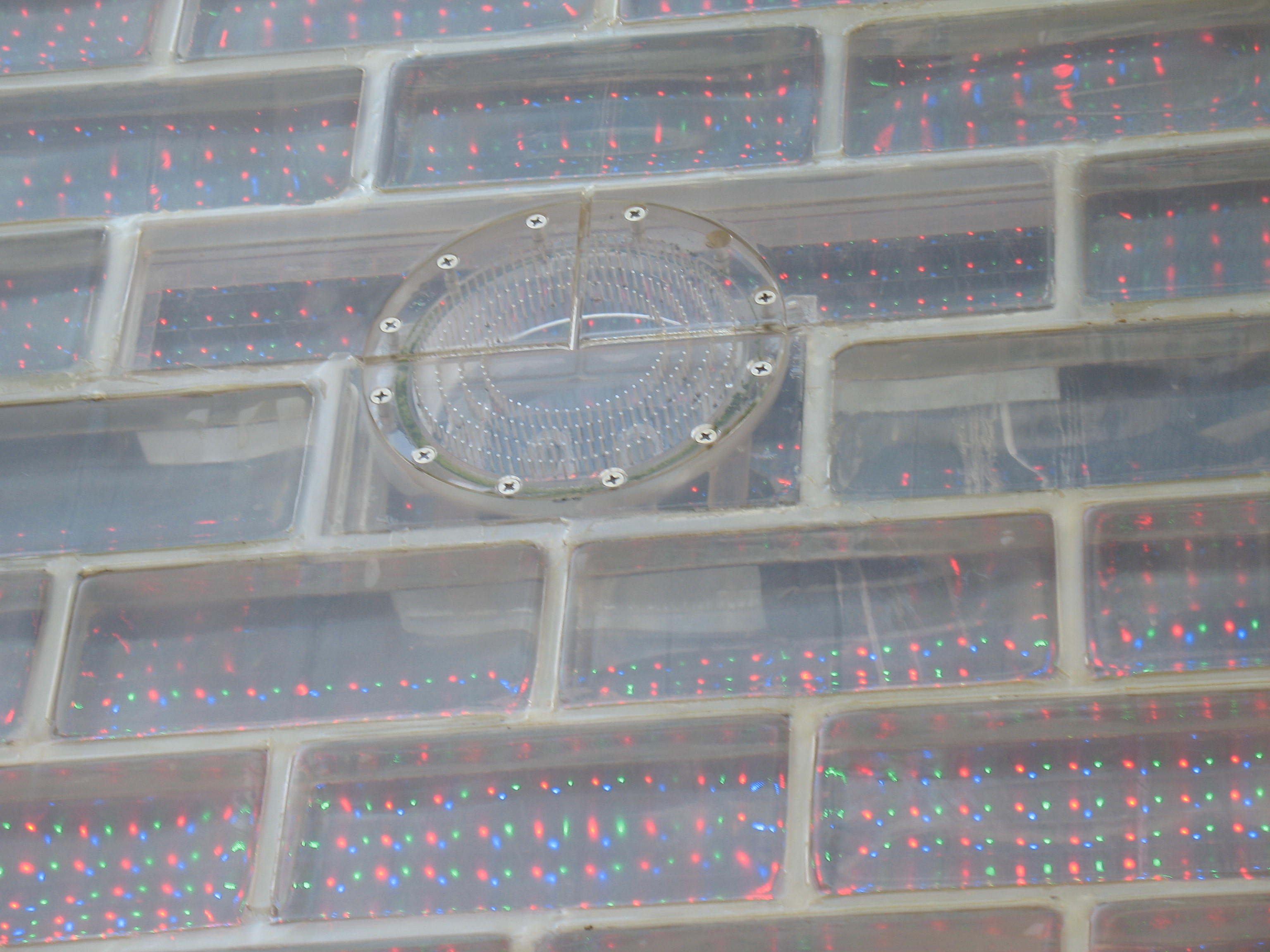
The water nozzle

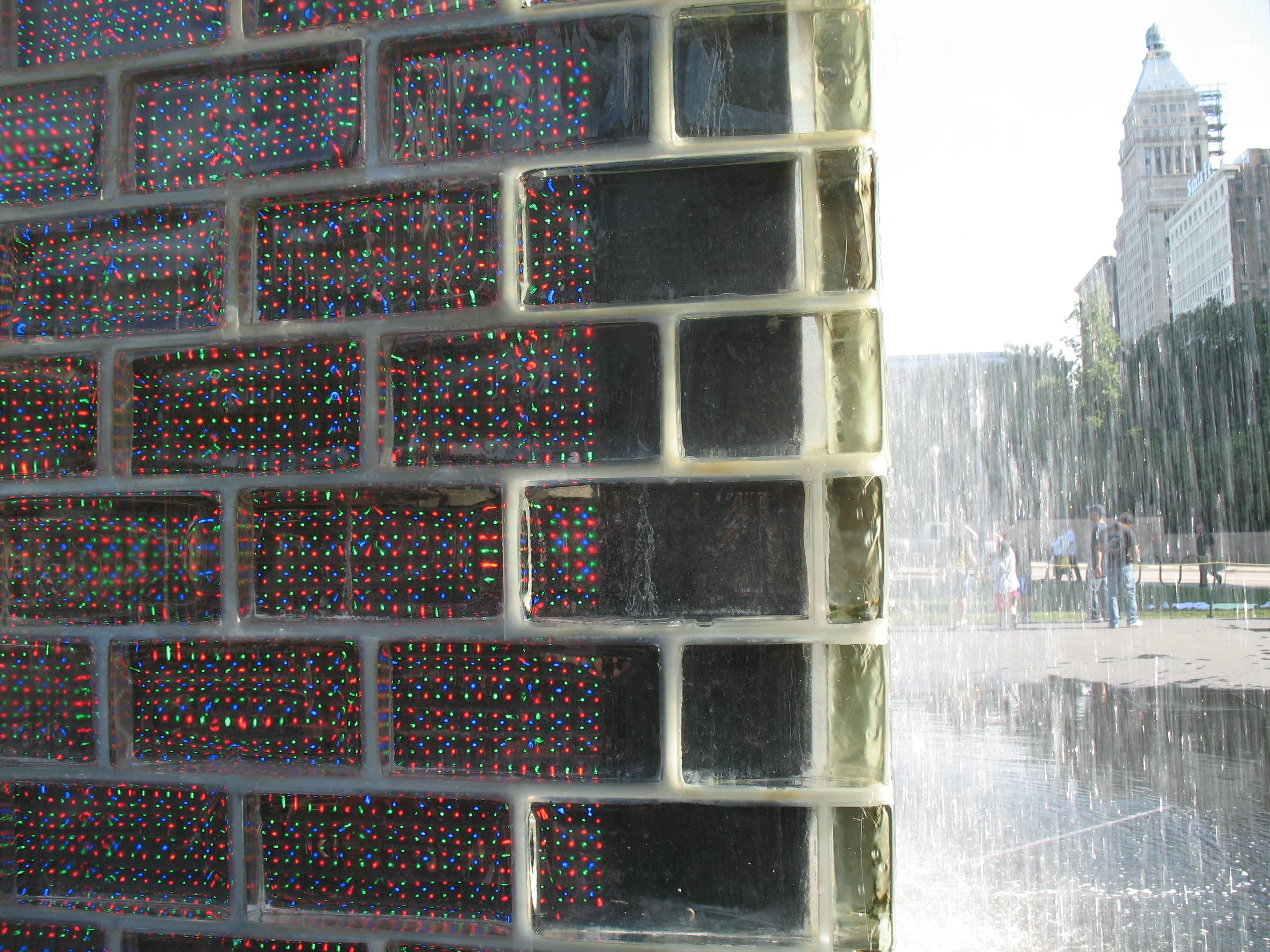
LED lights can be seen behind the front face and are absent from other faces.

The fountains use over one million LEDs. The inner surface of each tower uses 147 smaller screens with a total of 264,480 LED points (each with two red, one blue and two green LEDs). The physical demands of LED screens, in particular the red, green, and blue long-life light bulbs and the requisite circuitry, created three major challenges: supporting the physical structure, combating heat buildup, and optimizing perceptibility of the display. Plensa had used LED fixtures on previous projects, and thus had some experience with these issues. The LED structure is not supported as a single wall (which would be 50 feet (15 m) high), but rather as several segments that are noticeable as visible horizontal bands every few feet: these show where the LED equipment is supported. The heat generated is handled by fans that cool the air at the bottom, that then works its way through the chimney-like tower. Perceptibility was determined to be optimal with LED lights 2 inches (51 mm) behind the glass.

LEDs were chosen because they were viewed as the lowest maintenance option of the possible color changing fixtures. LEDs fit into an electrical circuit, causing illumination by the movement of electrons in the semiconductor material and making a filament unnecessary, so the bulbs never burn out and do not get too hot. Fins were added to the screens to keep direct sunlight from hitting the LEDs. Color Kinetics (now part of Philips Solid-State Lighting Solutions, which is now called Philips Color Kinetics) ColorBlast 12 LEDs fixtures are used to illuminate the tower structures and glass in an attempt to meet Plensa's objective that the towers have a light and translucent appearance, with their internal structures reflecting light from behind the glass surface. The electronics were designed to be adaptable to the time of day, weather and season and to meet the desired century-long longevity and dependability objectives set by the design team in response to the thirty-year directive.

==== Structural challenges ====
During construction the underground parking garage remained open. An additional challenge was designing the structure to facilitate interior access for ongoing maintenance and repairs, while accommodating two levels of underground parking underneath. The challenge was solved by combining a T-bar grid to absorb weight with about 150 "outriggers", or "tiebacks", inserted through the video wall to support the glass blocks and absorb wind loads. This design allows for the removal of individual glass blocks for cleaning or repair without disruption to the display. The filtered air inside the towers helps minimize the need for cleaning. Crown Fountain's design not only included interior access for technical repairs, but also incorporated exemplary, non-discriminatory, barrier-free accessibility, because its interactivity is not limited to the able-bodied. The force of the water accounts for the entire range of possible interactive visitors.

== Dedication and operation ==
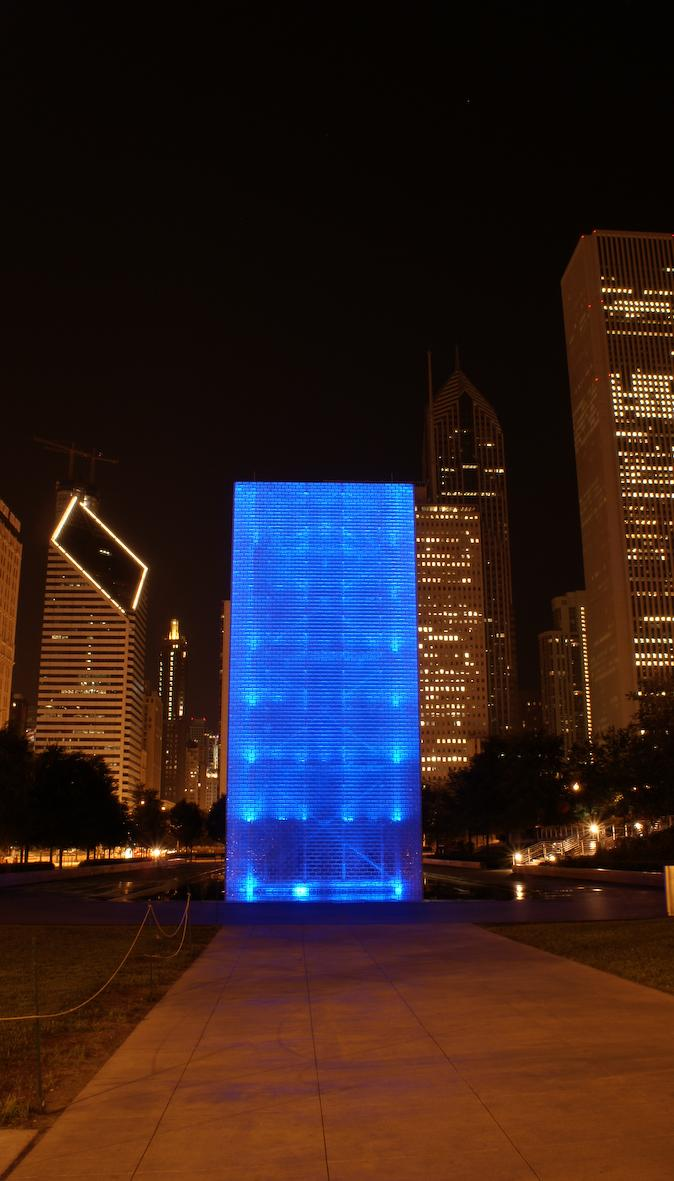
Night view of south tower (flank view)

=== Unveiling ===
Construction of the video sculpture was completed for testing without the fountain's water features on May 18, 2004. Originally, Plensa had planned to have each face appear for 13 minutes, and this continued to be the targeted duration when the testing of the sculpture occurred. Eventually, professors at the School of the Art Institute of Chicago convinced him to use only five-minute videos.

Plensa's design of Crown Fountain was unveiled to the public on July 16–18, during the 2004 grand opening celebrations for Millennium Park. At the time of the unveiling, Crown Fountain, like the nearby Cloud Gate, was incomplete because only 300 of the videos had been refined for public display. It was officially dedicated on July 24, 2004 as part of a special private fundraising party that raised $3 million for the Millennium Park Conservancy fund.

=== Operation ===
The control center for the synchronization of images, water flow, and lighting color and intensity is beneath one of the towers, in a room that covers 550 square feet (51 m^{2}). The room houses high-definition video servers and equipment temperature sensors. Hard drives contain all the individual electronic computer files of the face videos. Generally, the computer programs automatically perform tasks such as determining when the face will pucker and, if weather conditions permit, when to turn the water on and off. Using low- rather than high-resolution images was both less expensive and created a better display for the average viewer. A Barco show controller selects the sequence of faces one at a time and determines a random tower lighting selection of one of eight LED colors programmed into an Electronic Theatre Controls (ETC) Emphasis control system. At night, the ETC system controls spotlights that illuminate the cascading water and that are dimmed by special wet-use location ground fault circuit interrupters. The control room covers an area equal to 26 parking spaces in the underground parking garage, which costs the city $100,000 annually in terms of the opportunity cost of lost revenue (in 2004 dollars). Maintenance issues for the fountain range from kids removing the adhesive between the bricks to pipes in need of maintenance. As of 2014, annual upkeep costs were approximately $400,000. Typically, the fountain's water features function between mid-spring and mid-fall, but the images remain on the screen year-round.

==== Video sculpture ====
The front face of each tower is animated with a continuous, dynamic exhibit of lights and electronic images. Although the screens on the towers periodically display clips of landscapes such as waterfalls, most intriguing are the display of faces of Chicago residents. About 1,000 faces of Chicagoans are shown in a random rotation, the order determined using a Barco show controller. Each face is displayed for five minutes, with a brief period between each of these videos during which the sculpture is unlit. As a result, no more than 12 faces appear per hour during the summer. However, during the winter a version without the final one minute of puckering is shown, so the video segments then are only four minutes each. The video pattern also includes a three-minute water scene every half-hour and a 30-second fade-to-black every 15 minutes. If all the faces were shown consecutively, instead of randomly, they would each appear about once every eight days. A June 2007 article in the Chicago Sun-Times reported that many of the subjects who had their images digitized for the project had yet to either see their own images or hear of anyone who had seen them.

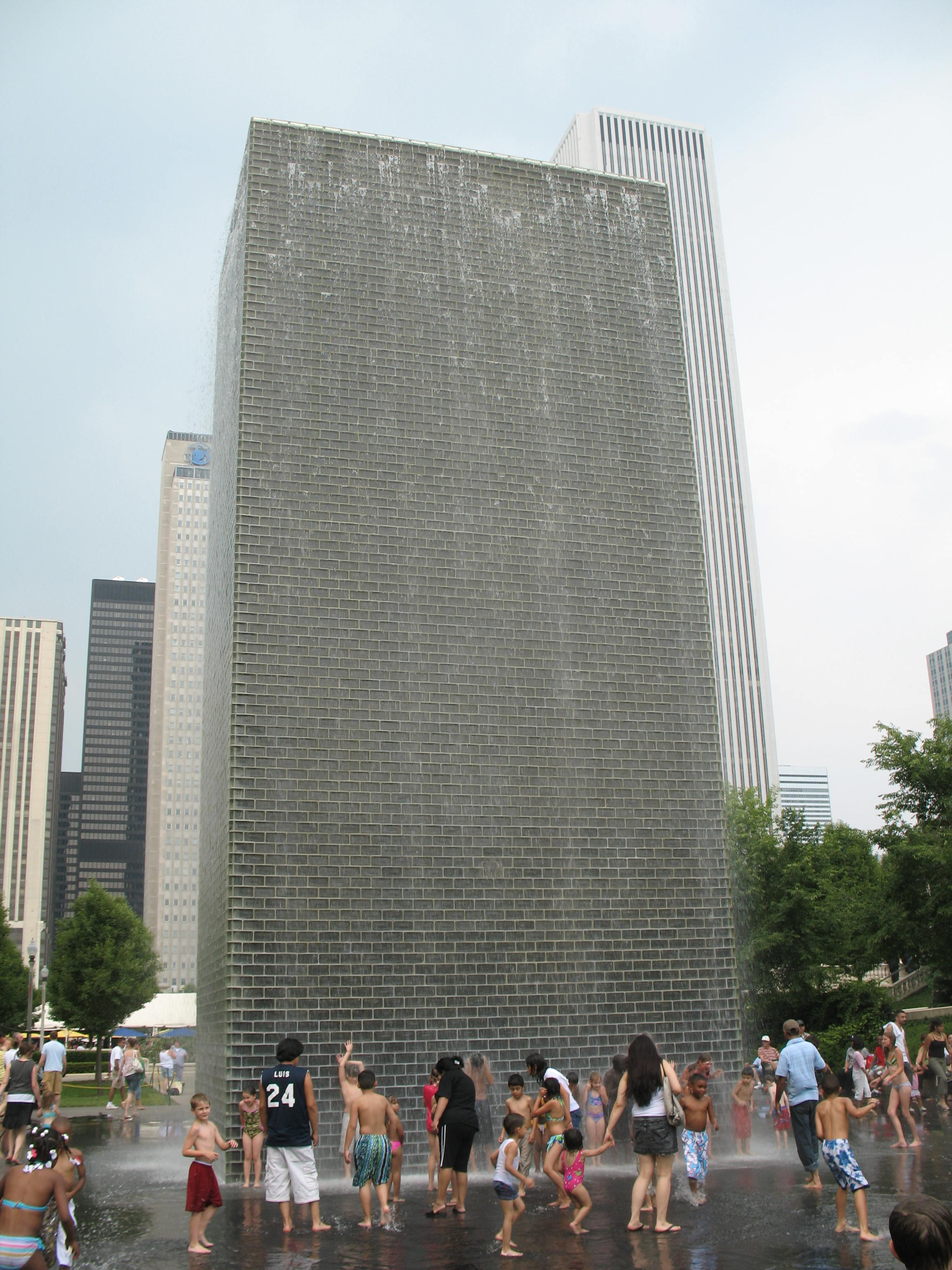
Every 15 minutes the LEDs fade to black and there is a brief pause between individual videos.

The spouting water from the faces of the towers appears to be flowing from the displayed subject's mouth from a 6-inch (150 mm) nozzle located in the center of each interior face 12 feet (3.7 m) above the reflecting pool. Images are shown daily year-round, while the water feature only operates from May 1 to approximately October 31, weather permitting. The park is open to the public daily from 6 a.m. to 11 p.m.

Each tower is illuminated from within on three sides by approximately 70 color-changing Color Kinetics LED lighting fixtures per tower, while the fourth side features opposing Barco LED display screens. At night, some of the videos are replaced by images of nature or solid colors. Also at night, the other three sides of the fountain display changing colors. The outer Color Kinetics surfaces randomly display the translucent glow of one of eight colors along with each of the inner opposing faces.

==== Fountain ====
The drainage system for the water shooting into the reflecting pool uses end-to-end drainage slits in lieu of central drains.

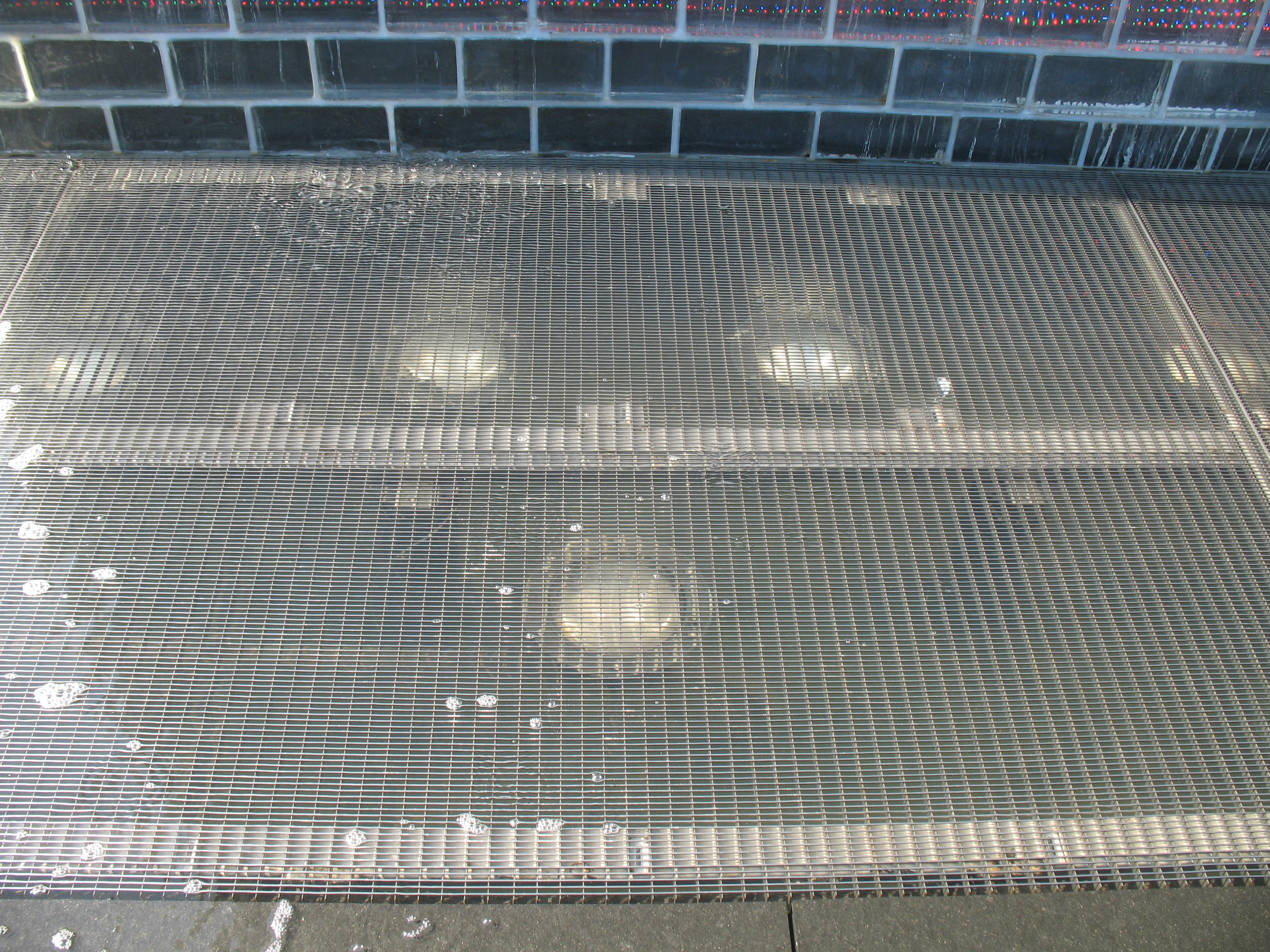
The cascading water falls towards grating.

Crown Fountain has both slits and a grate for drainage (pictured above right) to drain the 11,520 US gal (43,608 L; 9,592 imp gal) of water per minute. When the videos are not on the front of the tower, water cascades down each of the facades. The water is filtered, pumped and recirculated through the fountain. Dual pump rooms below each tower draw water from a reservoir beneath the reflecting pool. There are 12 mechanical pumps that are regulated from a control room in the underground parking garage beneath the south tower of the fountain. The water in the reflecting pool has a depth of about 0.33 millimetres (0.013 in).

== Controversies ==
Before the fountain was completed in 2004, Art Institute of Chicago president James Wood felt the columns would be too tall and other community leaders felt that the height and scale of the project stemmed from a "pissing contest" with other park feature artists. Grant Park has been protected since 1836 by "forever open, clear and free" legislation that has been affirmed by four previous Illinois Supreme Court rulings. Aaron Montgomery Ward twice sued the city of Chicago in the 1890s to force it to remove buildings and structures from Grant Park, and to keep it from building new ones. As a result, the city has what are termed the Montgomery Ward height restrictions on buildings and structures in Grant Park. However, Crown Fountain and Jay Pritzker Pavilion, which stands 139 feet (42 m) tall, were exempt from the height restriction because they were classified as works of art and not buildings or structures.

In November 2006, Crown Fountain became the focus of a public controversy when the city added surveillance cameras atop each tower. Purchased through a $52 million Department of Homeland Security grant to the Chicago area, the cameras were part of a surveillance system augmenting eight other cameras covering all of Millennium Park. The city said the cameras, similar to those used throughout the city at high-crime areas and traffic intersections, were intended to remain on the towers for several months until permanent, less intrusive replacements were secured. City officials had consulted the architects who collaborated with Plensa on the tower designs, but Plensa himself had not been notified. Public reaction was negative, as bloggers and the artistic community decried the cameras on the towers as inappropriate and a blight. The city said that the cameras were largely for security reasons, but also partly to help park officials monitor burnt-out lights. The Chicago Tribune quickly published an article concerning the cameras as well as the public reaction, and the cameras were removed the next day. Plensa supported their removal.

== Updating ==
In 2014, the hardware and software behind the fountain's operation were replaced. At the time there were plans to replace LED lighting with incandescent bulbs on each of the non-video display surfaces and to replace the video surface LEDs. Plensa, who maintained control of the video faces for the first two years of the fountain's operation, understands that future generations may wish to update the faces used in the rotation of videos to reflect changes in humanity going forward. In 2014, an additional 1000 faces were anticipated for 2016.

== Critical reception ==
Other notable Chicago fountains
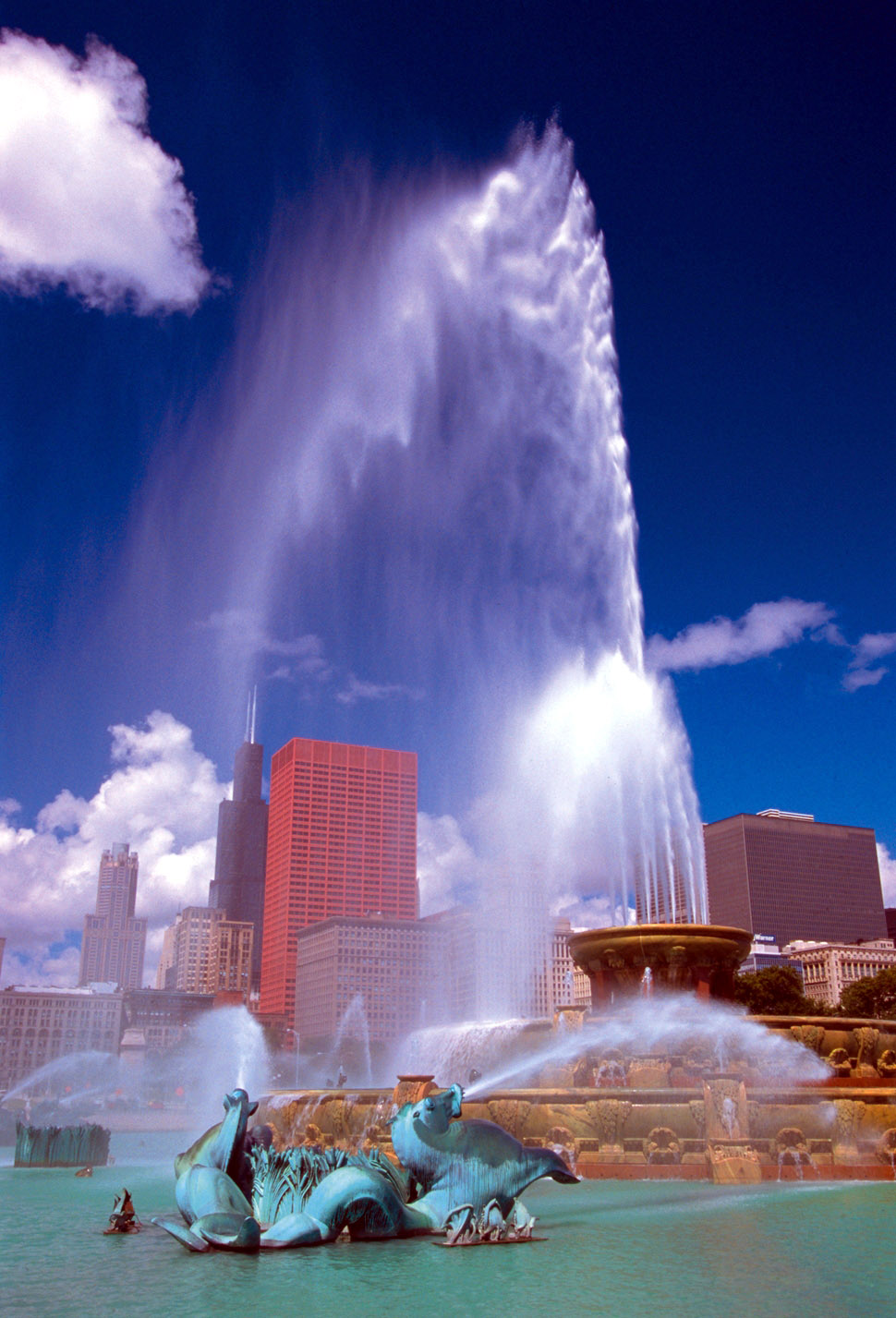
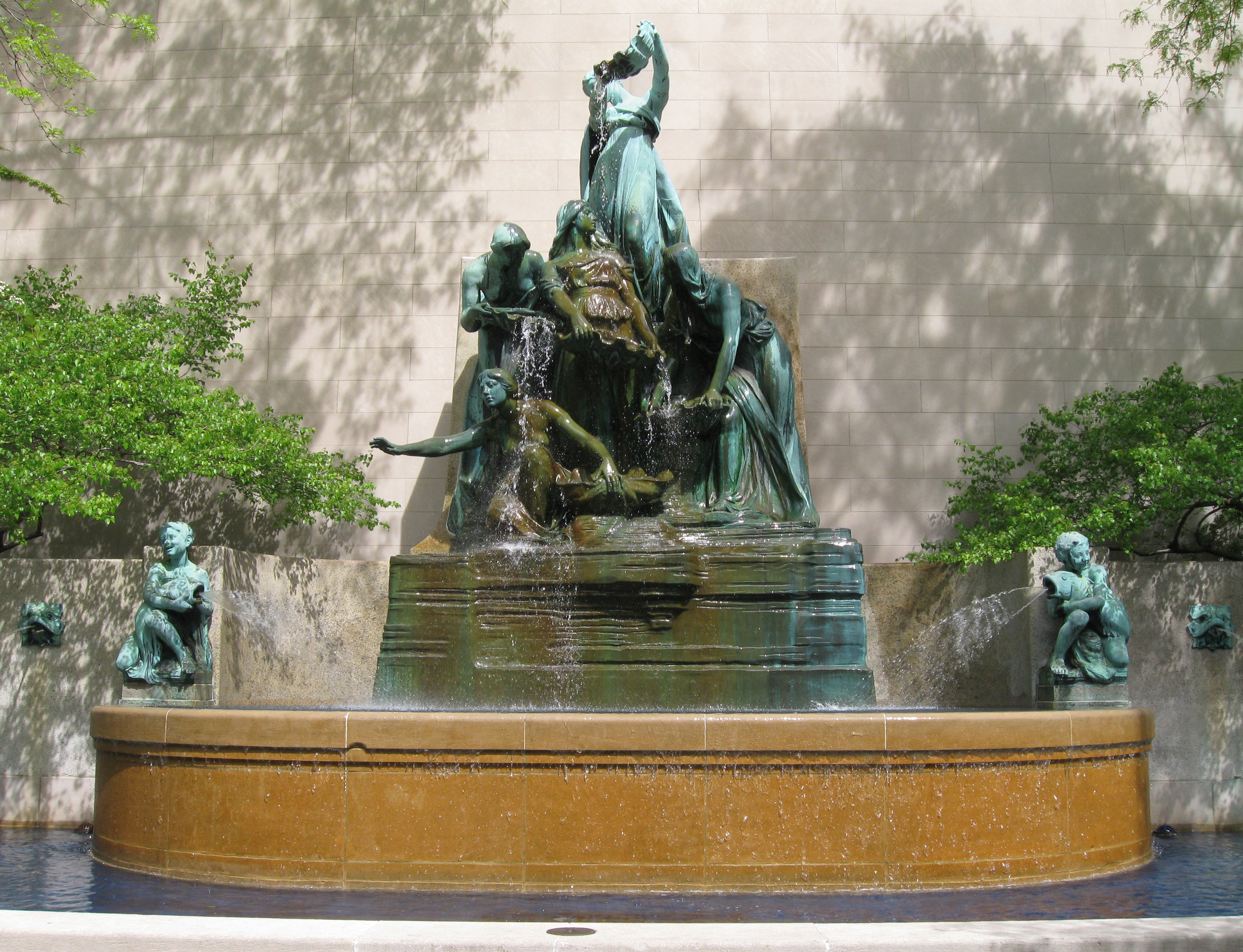
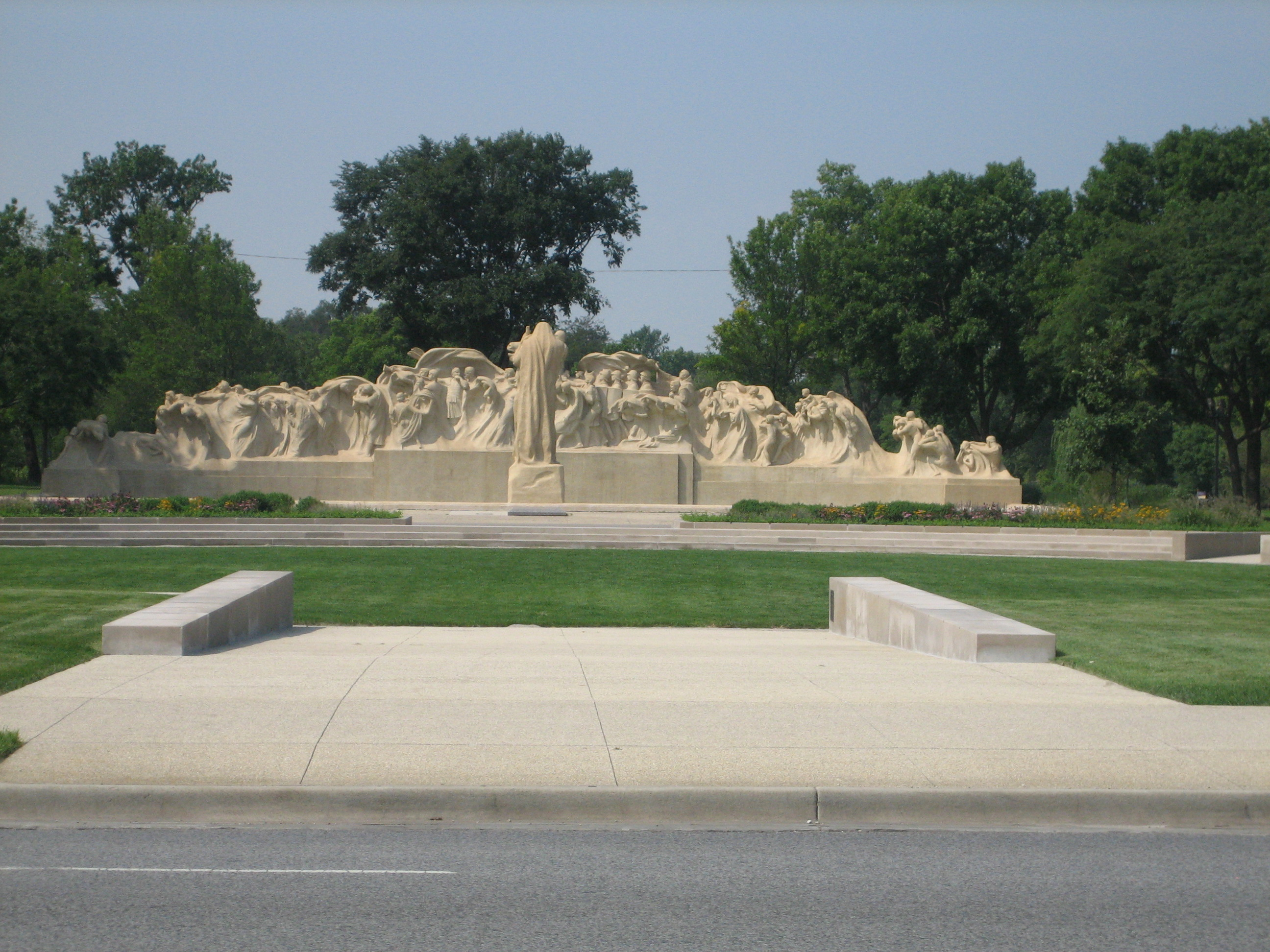
Buckingham Fountain, Fountain of the Great Lakes, and Fountain of Time

Crown Fountain, Trevi Fountain, and Buckingham Fountain, as well as natural water features such as Old Faithful, are examples of the ability of water to attract people and hold their attention. Crown Fountain has more interactivity than other Chicago fountains, such as Buckingham Fountain and Lorado Taft's Fountain of the Great Lakes and Fountain of Time (all but the last are in Grant Park). These other Chicago fountains are traditional in that they discourage viewer touching; Buckingham Fountain is surrounded by a fence, and Taft's fountains are surrounded by moats. In contrast, Crown Fountain provides an open invitation to play in the fountain's water.

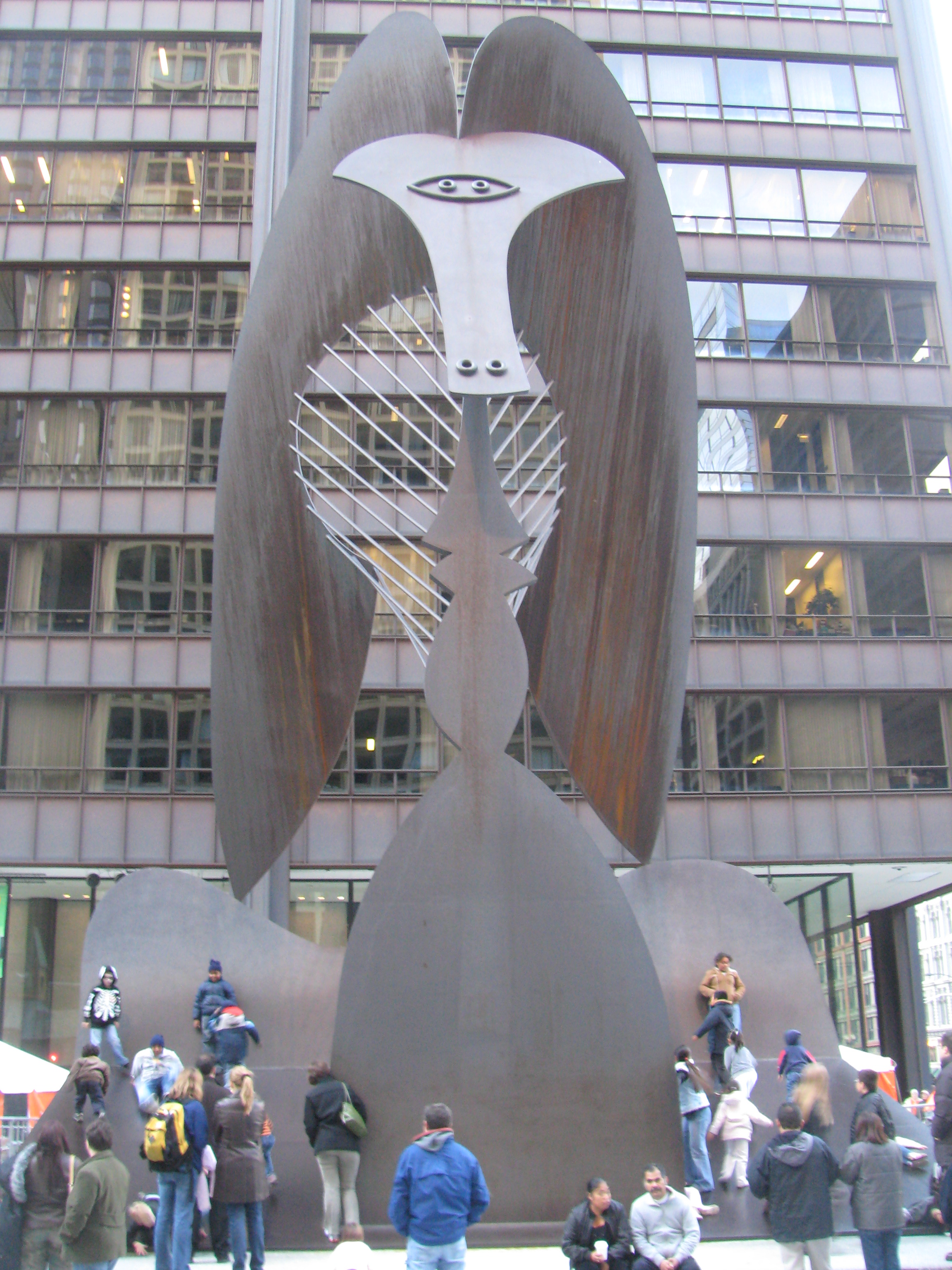
Crown Fountain's inviting interactivity is likened to the nearby jungle gym–like Chicago Picasso.

U.S. News & World Report describes the fountain as an exemplary feature of the city's numerous urban parks. Chicago Tribune architecture critic Blair Kamin, who is pleased with the sculptures' verticalness, says the fountain helps appropriately depict the modern 21st-century urban park. The Chicago Sun-Times describes the fountain as "eye-catching, crowd-friendly ... high-tech [and] ... contemporary". The New York Times calls the fountain an "extraordinary art object". Frommer's describes the fountain as public art at its best. The beauty of the fountain is, as the San Francisco Chronicle explains, that it is high-concept art for all to enjoy. The Financial Times refers to the fountain as a "techno-fountain". The fountain is praised for its technical features by industry magazines and has won various awards. The project won the 2006 Bombay Sapphire prize for its design work with glass. Critical reviews were not unanimous in their praise. One Chicago Tribune critic was not impressed with JumboTron-like art, although he conceded the participatory element reminded him in a positive way of the jungle gym element of the Chicago Picasso.

The fountain is featured on the cover of Philip Jodidio's 2005 book, Architecture: Art. Although Plensa is considered to be a conceptual artist, according to Jodidio, Plensa created a work whose architectural aspects are paramount. Its location juxtaposed with the Historic Michigan Boulevard District's skywall highlights these aspects. Jodidio considers the work to be a modernization of the gargoyle theme, and feels that the scale of the enlarged faces humanize the work and challenges the architecture. The towers are an integral part of the skyline that have achieved rare permanence for contemporary art.

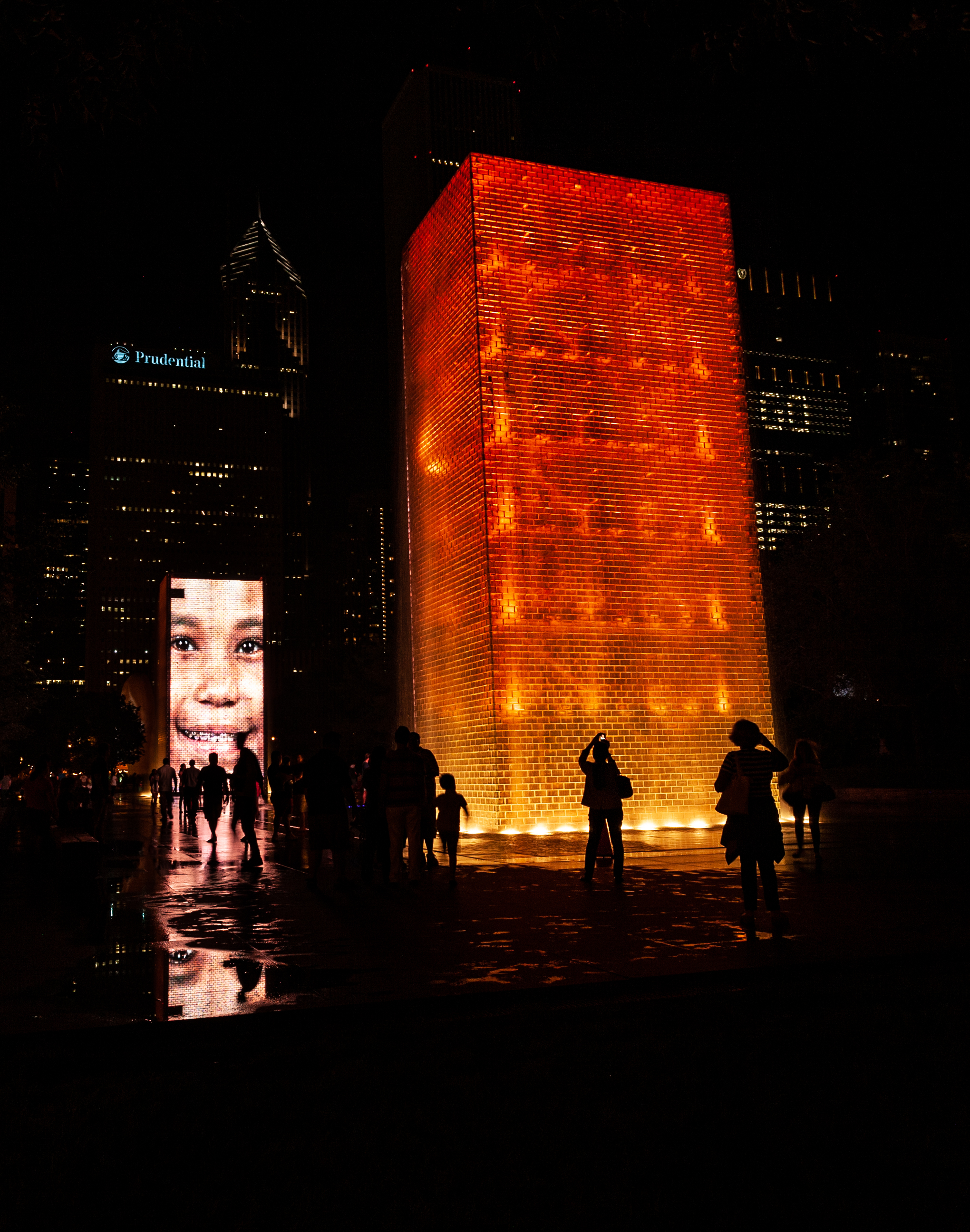
Crown Fountain, Millennium Park night photo

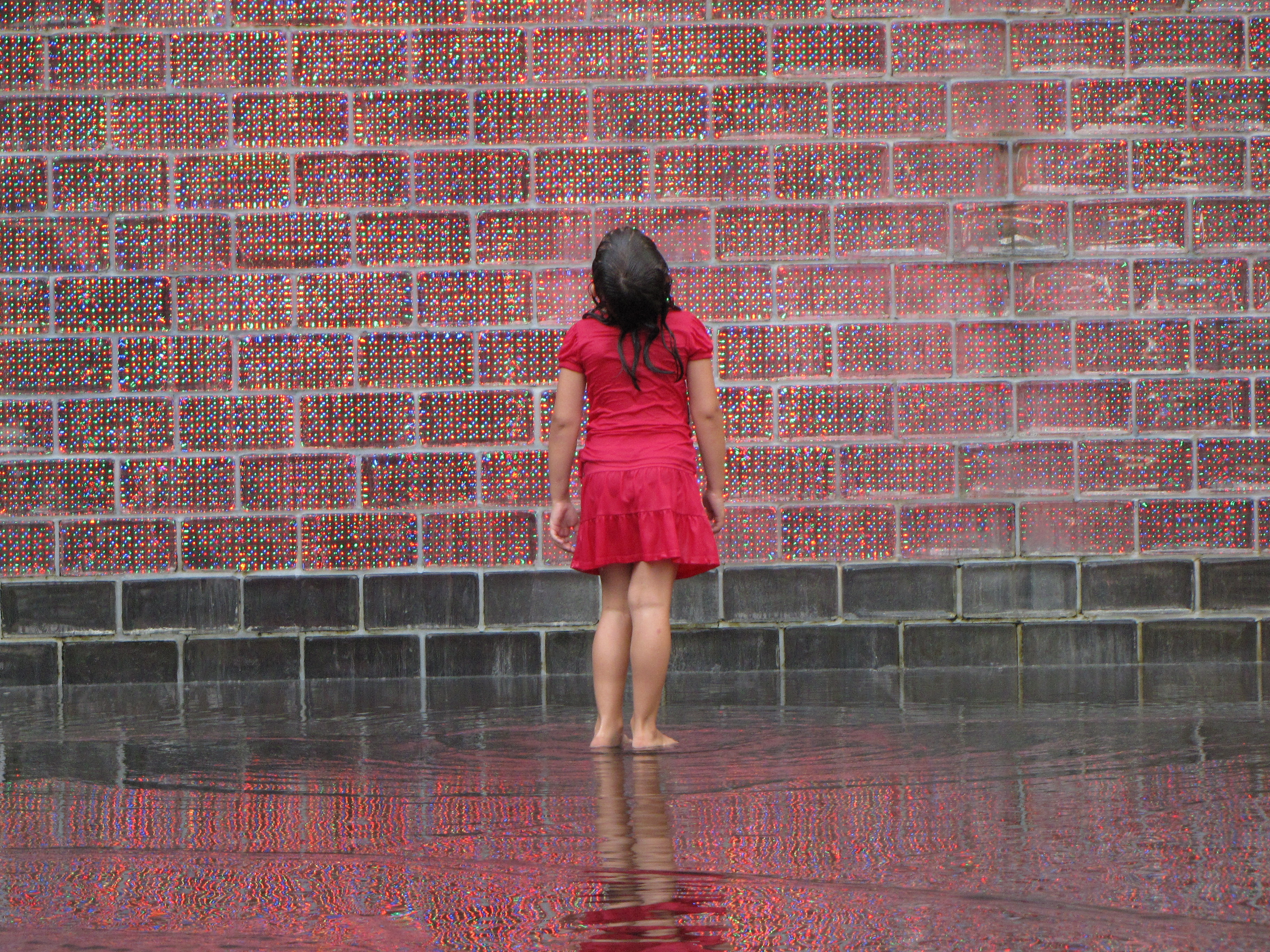
Child at Crown Fountain 2012

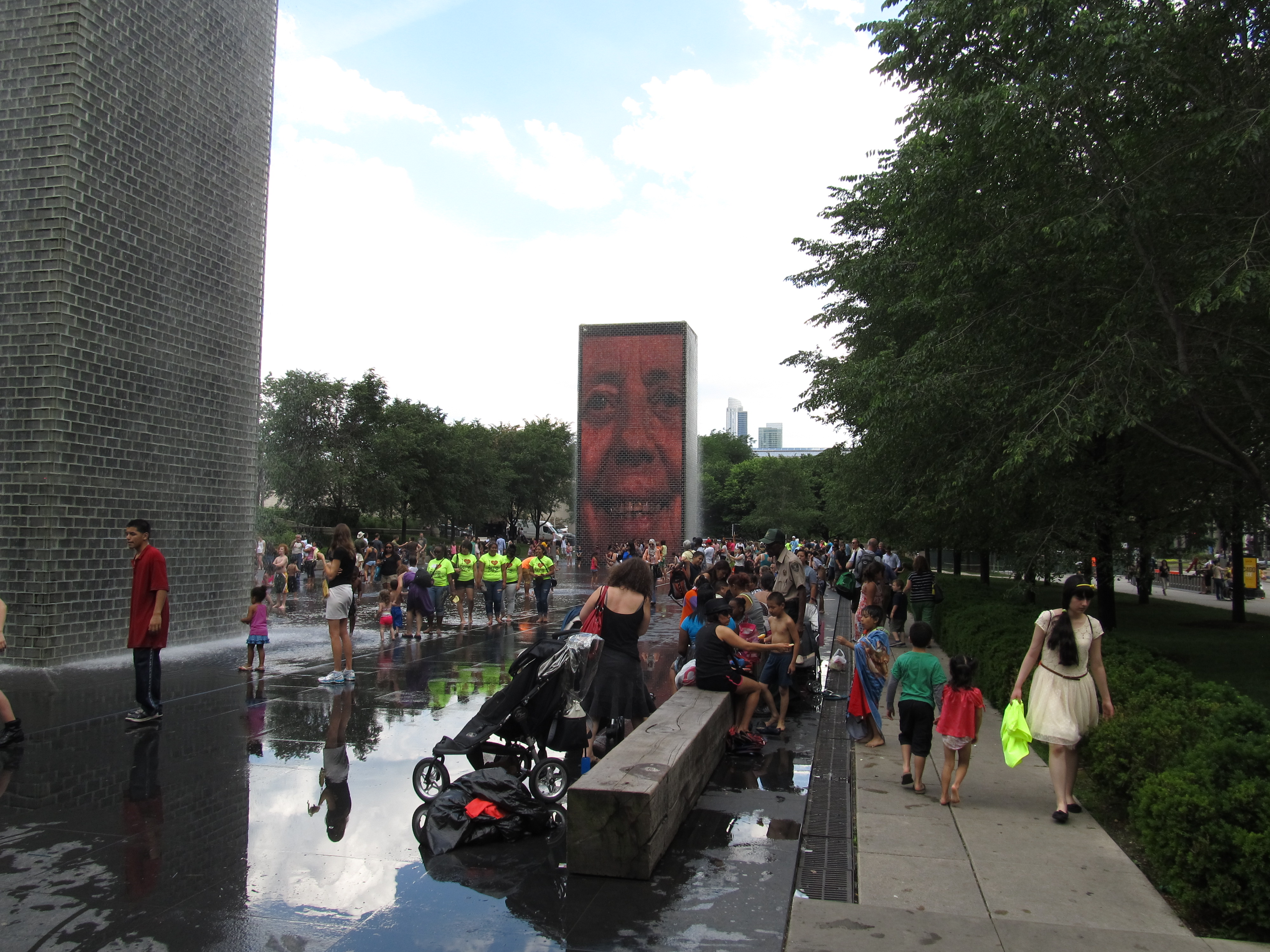
Crown Fountain, Millennium Park, Chicago, Illinois 2013

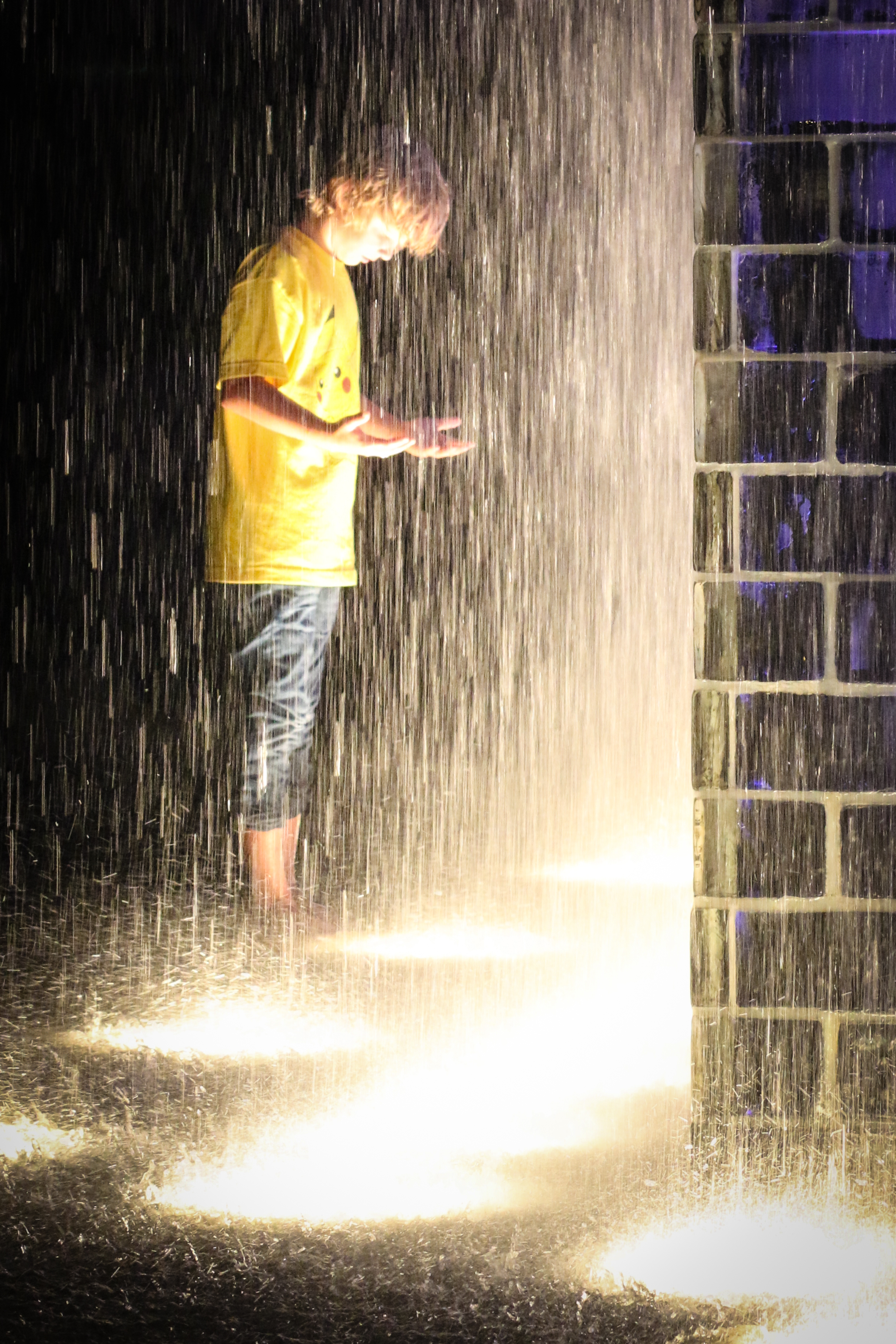
Boy in fountain, 2014

== See also ==
- Crystal Fountains
- List of public art in Chicago
