= Living Color Aquariums =

American acrylic tank manufacturing company

Living Color Aquariums (also known as Fish Tank Kings on National Geographic Wild) is a custom acrylic tank manufacturing company with headquarters in Fort Lauderdale, Florida.)They design and manufacture custom acrylic aquariums, water features, acrylic art, and themed exhibits. Over their history they have crafted a wide range of custom acrylic aquariums, water features, touch tanks, themed exhibits, and acrylic swimming pools. Living Color Aquariums also manufacturers pre-built tanks, artificial corals, reefs, life support systems, and other accessories needed to maintain aquariums.
