= Chicago Children's Museum =

Museum in Chicago, Illinois, US

Coordinates: 41°53′29″N 87°36′33″W

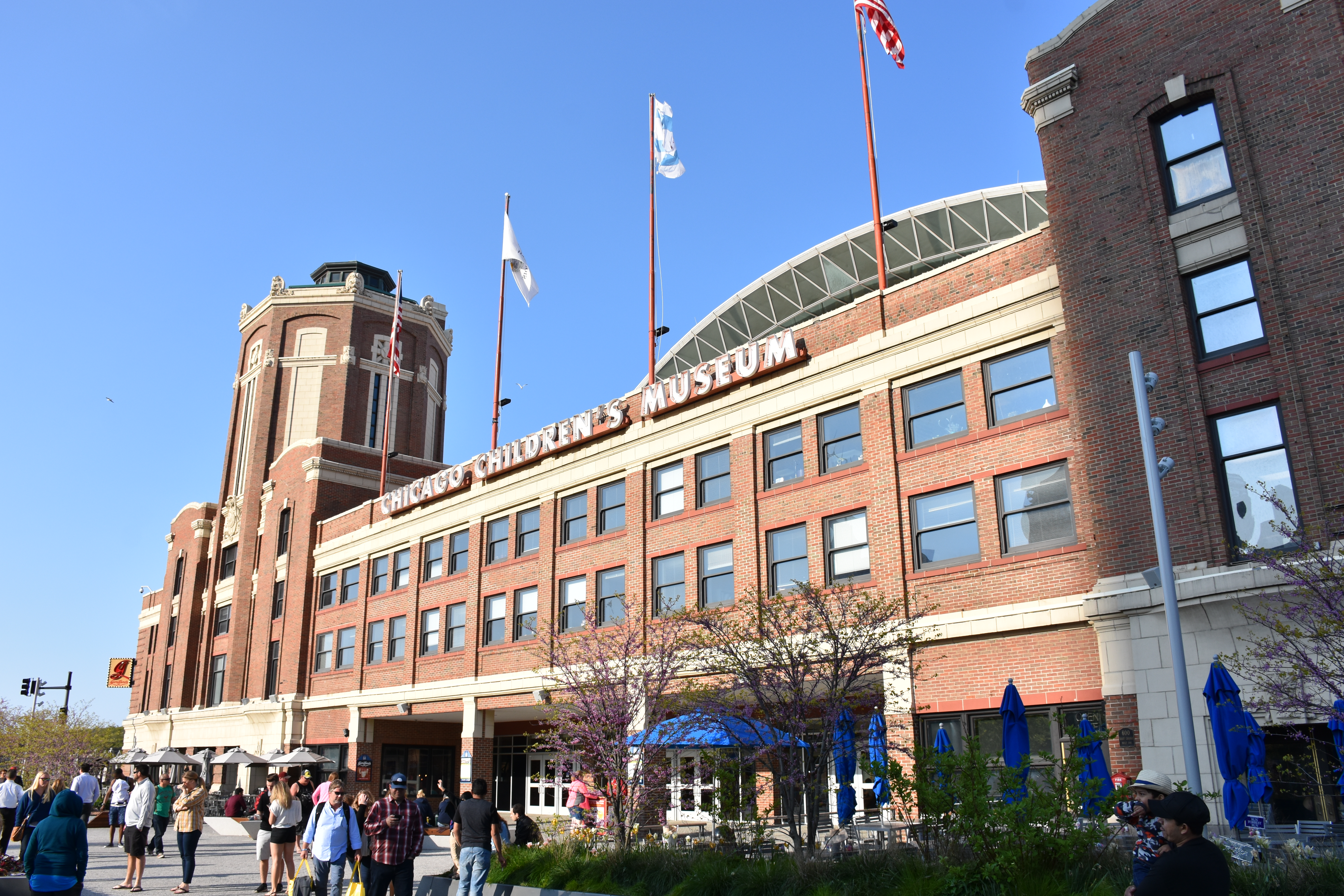
- Established: 1982
- Location: Navy Pier, Chicago, Illinois, US
- Website: www.chicagochildrensmuseum.org

The Chicago Children's Museum is located at Navy Pier in Chicago, Illinois. It was founded in 1982 by The Junior League of Chicago who were responding to programming cutbacks in the Chicago Public Schools. Originally housed in two hallways of the Chicago Public Library, it soon began to offer trunk shows and traveling exhibits in response to capacity crowds on-site.

The museum moved a number of times over its initial years of existence while it continued to search for a permanent home. In 1995, the Museum thought it found that home when it reopened as an anchor tenant at Navy Pier on Lake Michigan. The new facility offered 57,000 square feet (5,300 m^{2}) of exhibition space and included three floors of educational exhibits, public programs and special events. Upon the move to the Pier, the expansion made it the fourth largest children's museum in the United States. The museum serves more than 650,000 people, both at its Navy Pier location and in communities in and around Chicago, each year.

== Relocation ==
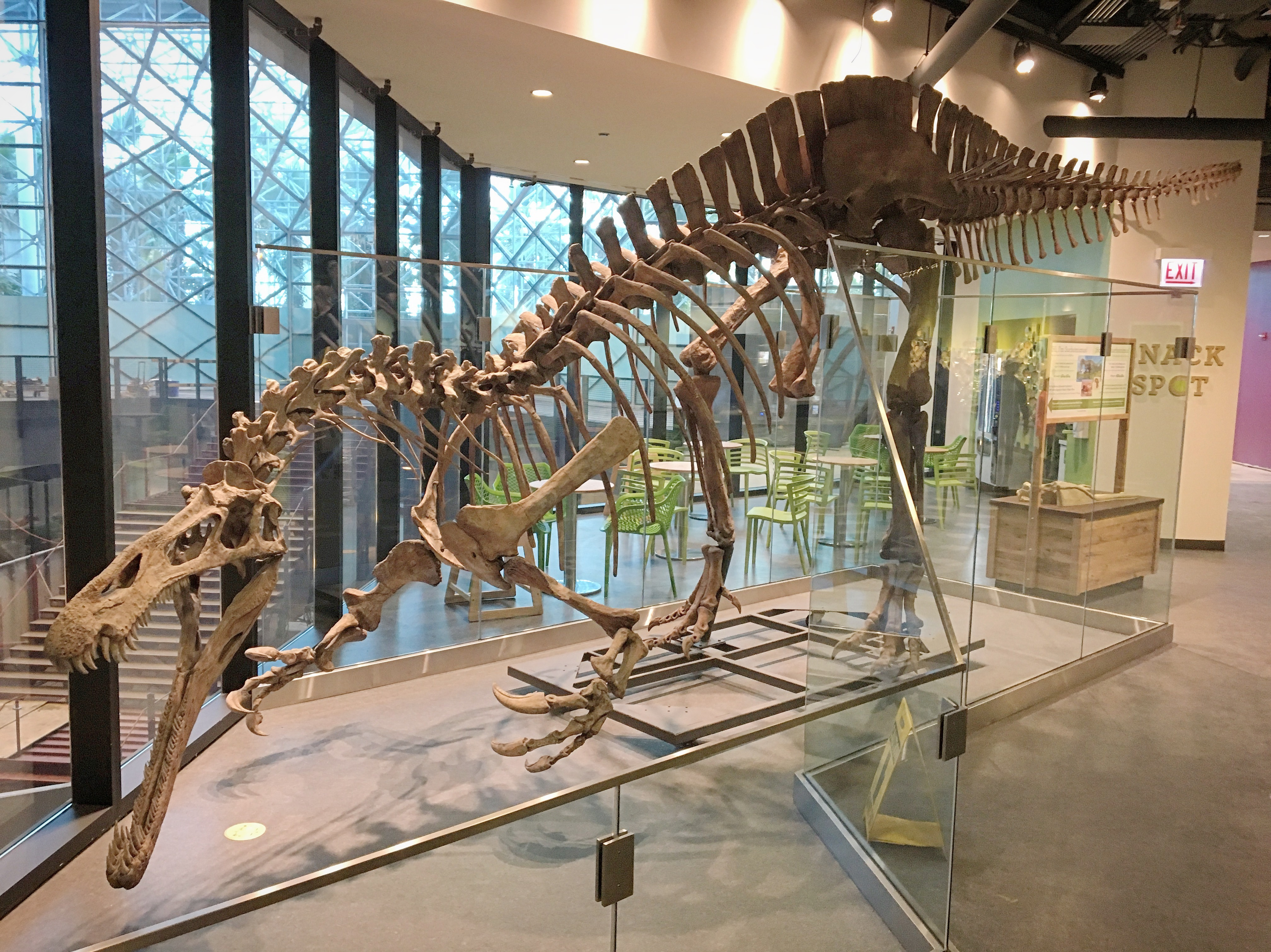
Skeleton of a Suchomimus dinosaur as featured in the museum

The Navy Pier space served the museum well for more than a decade, but in 2006, the Museum announced plans to expand further and move to another location at Daley Bicentennial Plaza in Grant Park that would more than double its exhibition space and allow for greater community access. Despite some strong support from the community especially from Mayor Richard Daley, the proposal has met with some resistance from others who feared that the museum's move will invade Grant Park's open space and set a precedent for other organizations moving to the park. The new facility at Grant Park was designed by the architecture firm of Krueck and Sexton Architects, who designed the Spertus Museum on Michigan Avenue.

By early 2011, museum officials affirmed their commitment to the plan but announced no new developments. Fundraising efforts had lagged while costs for the project had risen to an estimated $150 million. Crain's Chicago Business cited unnamed park officials who said that the museum will likely stay in its current location. At the same time, the Chicago Park District also awarded contracts to begin repairs on the garage under Daley Bicentennial Plaza. On October 25, 2011, the Chicago Park District unveiled a renovation plan for the northeast area of Grant Park that did not include the museum. When asked about the museum, the park district's director of planning and development replied, "Well, they're not coming to Grant Park."

In late 2012, the museum announced it had agreed on a new, 90-year lease with Navy Pier. The agreement includes an expansion of the museum's presence at the Pier by nearly 50 percent (57,000 square feet to 84,000 square feet). Details of the expansion were expected to be announced in 2013.
