= Krueck Sexton Partners =

US architecture firm

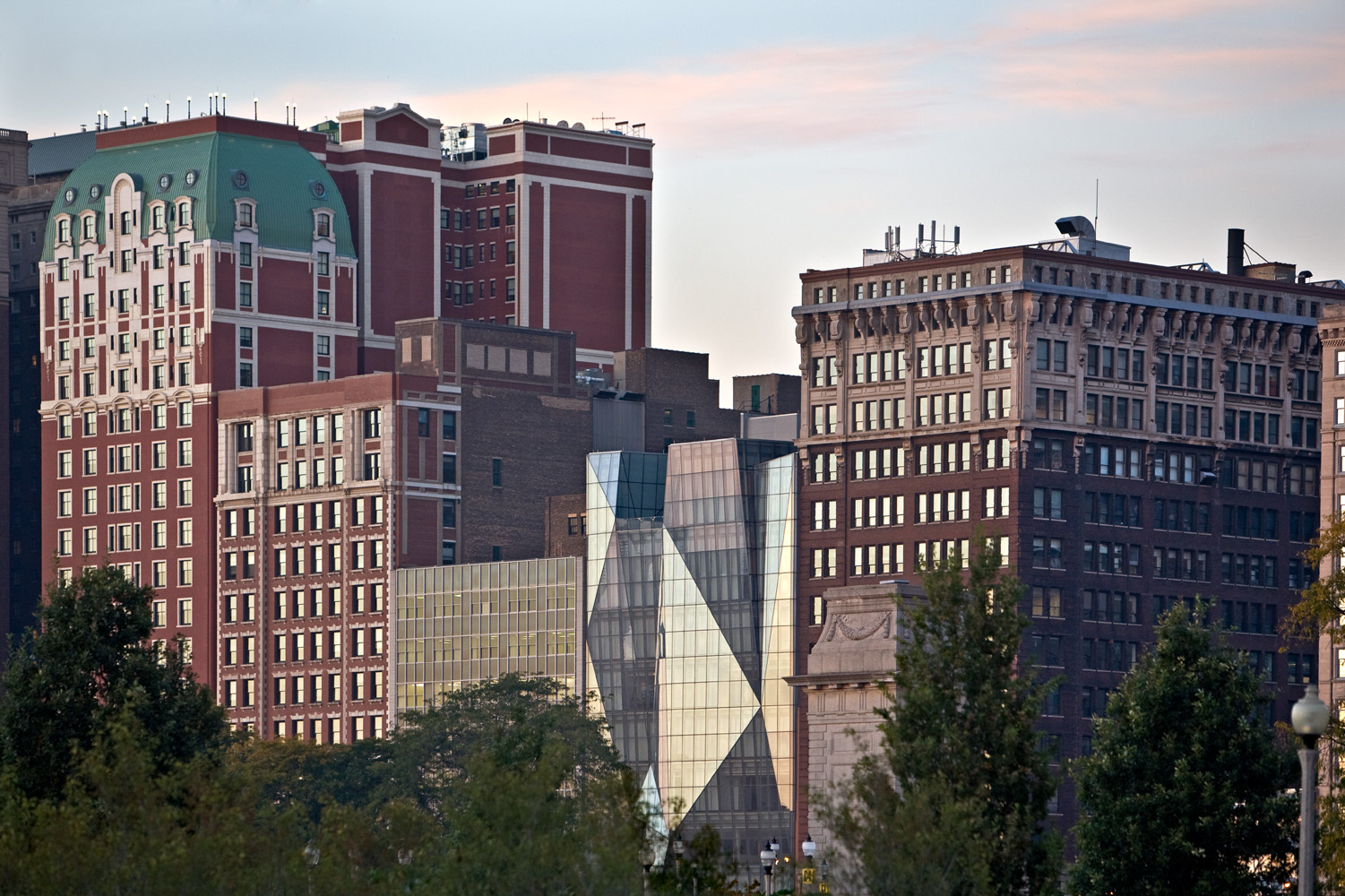

Practice information
- Key architects: Ron Krueck Mark Sexton Tom Jacobs
- Founded: 1979
- Location: Chicago, Illinois, United States

Significant works and honors
- Projects: Spertus Institute of Jewish Studies Crown Fountain; Steel and Glass House; Herman Miller National Design Center, Chicago CME Center Lobby Repositioning | 10+30 S. Wacker Drive

Website
- https://ks.partners/

Krueck Sexton Partners (formerly Krueck + Sexton Architects) is an architecture practice in Chicago, Illinois, United States, founded by Ron Krueck and Mark Sexton in 1979. Tom Jacobs was named the third principal in 2011 and now serves as one of the Co-Managing Partners with Mark Sexton. The practice is well known for its residential work and its corporate office projects.

== Overview ==
Krueck Sexton Partners has completed a variety of projects that have received US national and regional awards.

Among the firm's designs are Chicago's Spertus Institute and Crown Fountain. Spertus Institute is known for its all glass façade that provides views towards Grant Park and Lake Michigan, where 726 panes of glass in over 500 different shapes and sizes were used. Krueck and Sexton worked in close collaboration with artist Jaume Plensa to help realize his design for Crown Fountain in Chicago's Millennium Park.

The firm has also completed restoration work on Mies van der Rohe's 860-880 Lake Shore Drive Apartments where the facades were recoated and cleaned, the plaza was restored with a new concealed drainage system, and new sandblasted glass was used in the lobby, which more accurately represents the original design.

== Honors and awards ==
Krueck Sexton Partners has been the recipient of many national and regional awards for their designs, most notably for the Spertus Institute for Jewish Learning and Leadership, the Steel and Glass House, Crown Fountain, Herman Miller National Showroom in Chicago, and Phillips Plastics Custom Molding Facility. The firm's work has been featured and exhibited nationally and internationally.

- AIA Chicago Chapter Honor Awards
- Chicagoans of the Year, Chicago Tribune, 2005, Ron Krueck and Mark Sexton
- American Institute of Architects National Young Architect Award, 2012, Tom Jacobs
- Rudy Bruner Award for Urban Excellence
- AIA Illinois, Capitol Award, 2024, Mahalia Jackson Pop! Court

== Selected projects ==
=== Cultural/Public ===
- Spertus Institute for Jewish Learning and Leadership, Chicago, IL completed 2007.
- Crown Fountain, Chicago, IL 2004
- Chicago Children's Museum, Chicago, IL un-built

=== Preservation ===
- 860–880 Lake Shore Drive Apartments Restoration, Chicago, IL completed 2009
