= Crystal Fountains =

- Native name: Crystal
- Type: Incorporated company
- Industry: Water feature design and product manufacturing
- Founded: 1967 in Toronto, Ontario, Canada
- Founder: Roger L'Heureux
- Headquarters: Toronto, Ontario, Canada
- Area served: Global
- Key people: Paul and David L'Heureux

Crystal Fountains Inc., known as Crystal, is a water feature design and product manufacturing firm based in Toronto, Ontario, Canada. Founded in 1967, Crystal has completed thousands of projects worldwide, spread over 6 continents in over 30 countries. The company is best known for its work on the Crown Fountain in Millennium Park, Chicago, Illinois and the water feature at Washington Harbour in Georgetown, just outside Washington D.C.

== History ==
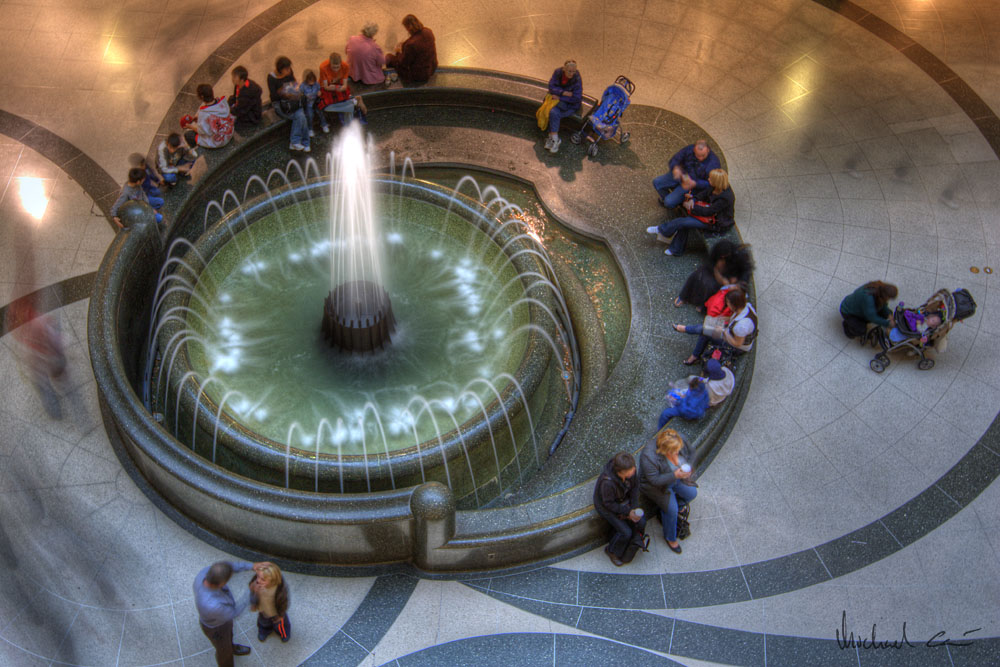
Main water feature in Toronto's Eaton Centre

Crystal was founded in 1967 by Roger L'Heureux, an engineer at a Toronto-based drain company, when he collaborated on fountains for the Expo 67 pavilions in Montreal with international sculptor Gerald Gladstone. Through the late 1960s and 1970s, L'Heureux continued to design and install water features throughout the Toronto area, often in conjunction with Gladstone. One of Crystal's best known projects of this era was the design and implementation of the principal water feature in Toronto's Eaton Centre. Opened in 1977, and still operating today, the fountain shoots a column of water 21 meters (69 feet) into the air every 10 minutes before catching it in a comparatively small basin 6 meters in diameter.

In 1977, Crystal acquired Decorative Fountain Company (or DEFO), a producer of fountain components such as nozzles and drains. With its new manufacturing capabilities, Crystal continued to expand through the late 1970s and 1980s. During this time, Crystal specialized in fountains for malls and other indoor spaces, focusing on selling water feature components and design services to predominately Canadian customers.

L'Heureux retired in 1987 and passed the business down to his two sons, Paul and David L'Heureux, as Crystal continued to move away from fountain installation and focus more heavily on design services and product supply. This design focus also ushered in a decade of international expansion, as Crystal began exporting its products and undertaking projects in foreign markets in the early 1990s.

In the 2000s, Crystal continued to expand internationally by opening a Dubai office in 2007, and completing notable projects such as Crown Fountain, the main water feature at Al Kout Mall in Fahaheel, Kuwait, and the lotus-inspired fountain in Moscow's White Square, Crystal's first foray into Russia.

As of 2011, Crystal Fountains Inc. officially rebranded itself as Crystal to better reflect the comprehensive nature of its water feature work. The company continues to operate as a fountain product manufacturer and supplier while designing a number of significant projects each year. Projects from this period include the World Voices fountain in the residential lobby of the world's tallest building, Burj Khalifa and the Aquatheatre aboard Royal Caribbean's Oasis of the Seas cruise ship. For the World Voices feature, Crystal collaborated with international artist Jaume Plensa (who had previously worked with Crystal on Crown Fountain ) to create a water feature that doubled as a work of art. The Aquatheatre, meanwhile, had to be incorporated into all the other systems aboard the Oasis Of the Seas, resulting in the first-ever theatrical water feature installed on a cruise ship.

Crystal's one of the essential work was the central water feature for the redevelopment of Washington Harbour in Georgetown. While the historical tower in the middle of the plaza remains in its original form, the rest of the fountain has been renovated with new lights, nozzles, and show capabilities. The water feature also converts into a 12,000 sq ft. ice rink in the winter months, making the Harbour a popular destination year round.

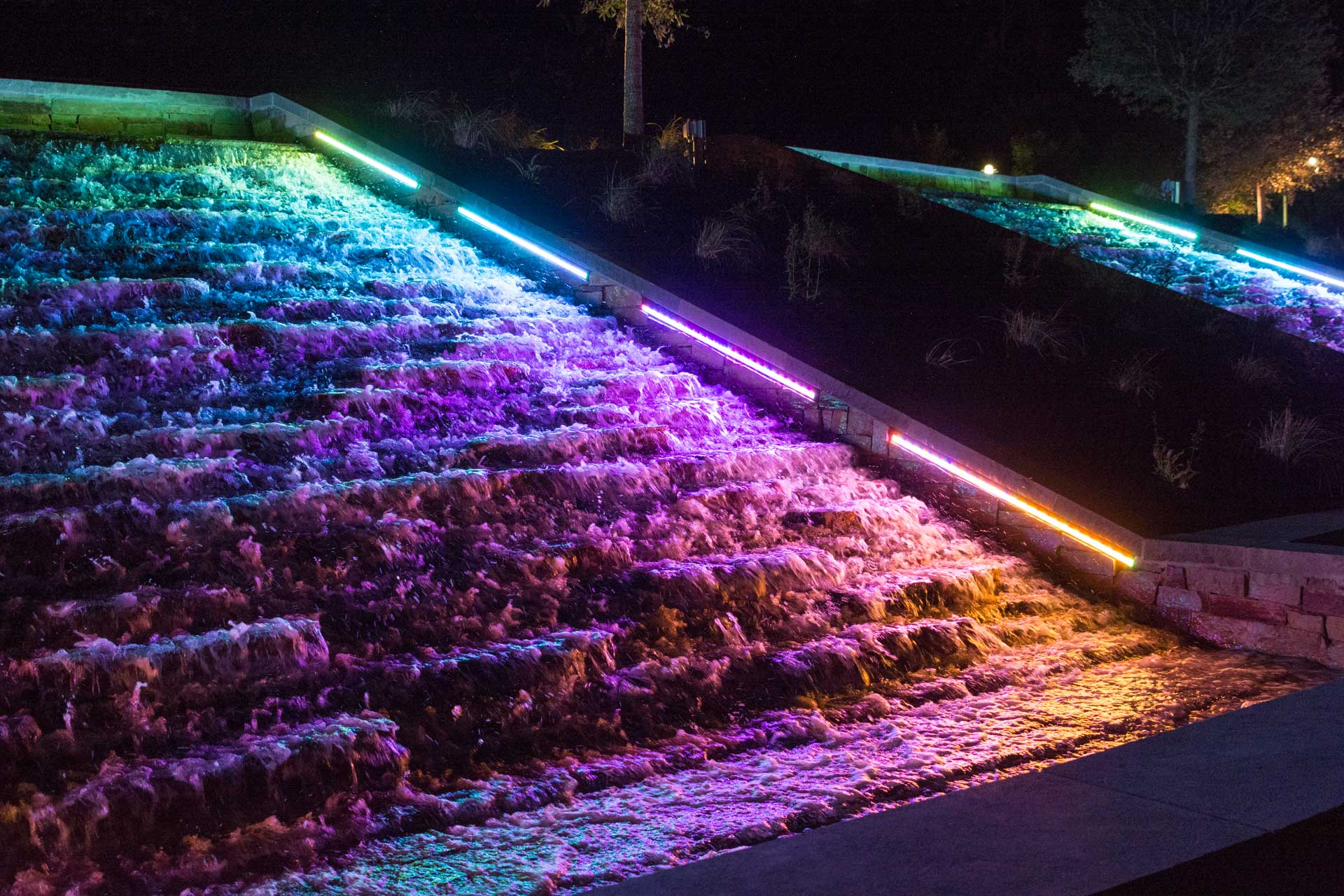
Woodlands Turning Basin in Texas

One of Crystal's projects was the water attraction that is part of the turning basin extension project of the Woodlands Development Group. , A 1.7-mile-long waterway flows through the heart of the development project. Crystal has helped illuminate the broad turning basin which is located on one end of the Woodlands Waterway with their latest Spectra Linear RGBACL technology. Another innovation in the LED lighting industry involves producing a range of colors from pure white to a wide range of the color spectrum, Crystal’s designers often customize this feature by, for example, programming the feature with specific shades such as 4th of July red, white and blue and the breast cancer awareness month pink.

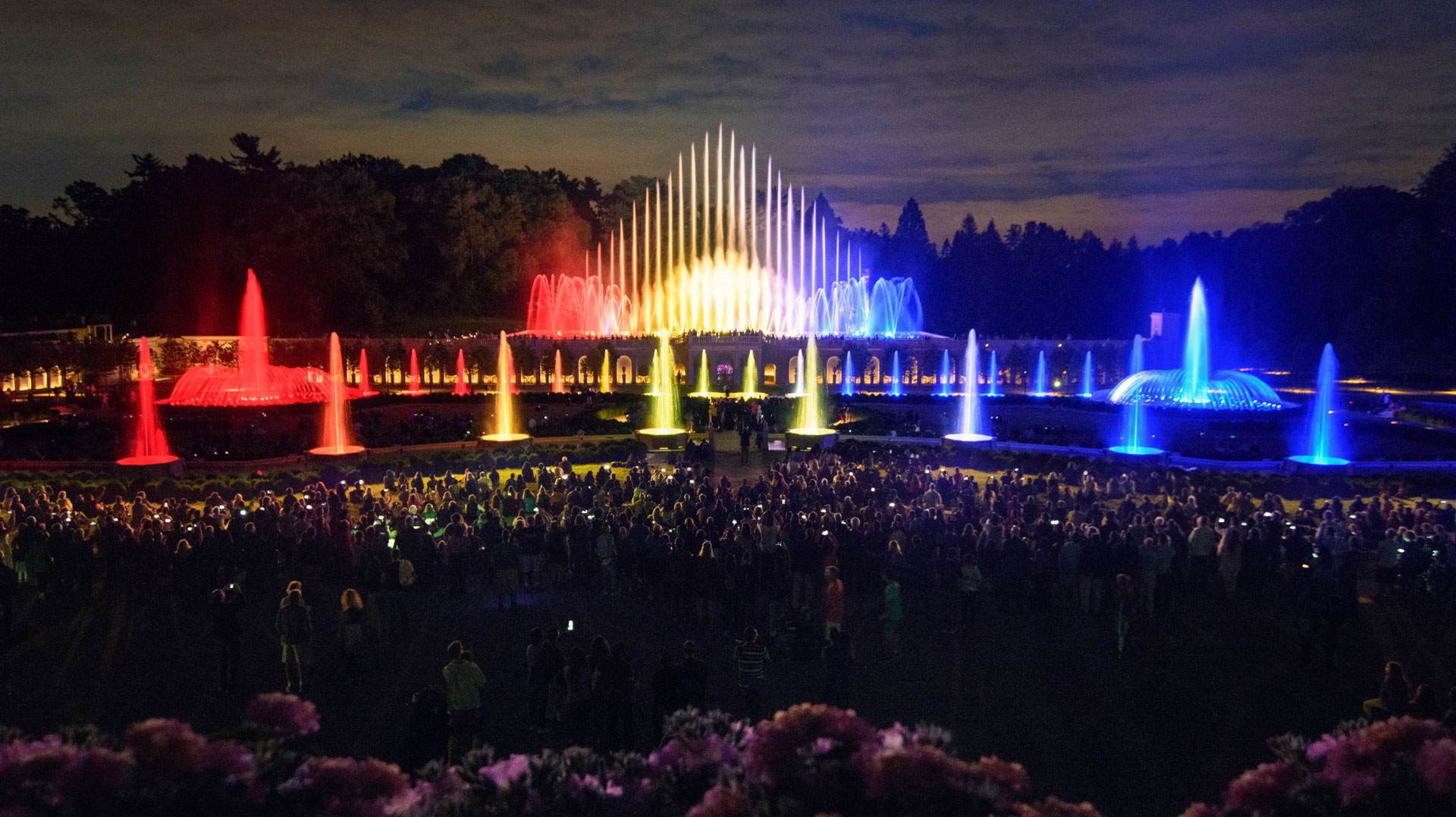
Main fountain in Kenneth Square, Pennsylvania

Revitalization at Longwood Gardens was another key project of Crystal featuring RGBACL LED technology. In order to preserve the historical significance and carry the fountain to modern 21st century simultaneously, Crystal provided LEDs with the capability to color match specific significant shades and tones, along with an infinite array of pantone colors to illuminate the water and surrounding landscape.

== Noteworthy projects ==
Crystal has been a part of the following significant projects in a design or product supply capacity:

- Crown Fountain, Chicago, Illinois
- Washington Harbour Fountain, Georgetown, Washington D.C.
- Grand Park Fountain, Los Angeles, California
- Sugar Beach Fountain, Toronto, Ontario
- White Square Fountain, Moscow, Russia
- World Voices Fountain, Dubai, United Arab Emirates
- Woodlands Turning Basin, The Woodlands, Texas
- Royal Palace of Venaria Fountain, Turin, Italy
- Zlote Tarasy Fountain, Warsaw, Poland
- Yas Island Welcome Pavilion Fountain, Abu Dhabi, U.A.E.
- Oasis Of The Seas Aquatheatre, Royal Caribbean International
- Canada's Wonderland Royal Fountain, Toronto, Ontario
- Washington Park Fountain, Cincinnati, Ohio
- Place des Spectacles Water Feature, Montreal, Quebec
- Dragon Water Feature at Taipei 101, Taipei, Taiwan
- Palace of Versailles Neptune and Latona Fountains, Versailles, France
- Longwood Gardens Water Feature, Kenneth Square, Pennsylvania,
