= Big Dipper (disambiguation) =

The Big/Great Dipper is the American English term for seven stars of the constellation Ursa Major (The Plough in British English).

Big Dipper also may refer to:

== Roller coasters ==
- Big Dipper (Battersea Park), a wooden roller coaster that operated in Battersea Park, London, England, from 1951 until 1972
- Big Dipper (Blackpool), a wooden roller coaster at Blackpool Pleasure Beach, England
- Big Dipper (Camden Park), a wooden roller coaster in Huntington, West Virginia
- Big Dipper (Geauga Lake), a wooden roller coaster formerly at the now defunct Geauga Lake Park in Ohio, US
- Woodstock Express (Michigan's Adventure), a steel roller coaster in Michigan, US previously named Big Dipper
- Big Dipper (Luna Park Sydney), a wooden roller coaster that operated at Luna Park Sydney, Australia from 1935 until 1979
- The Gold Coaster, a steel roller coaster which operated as Big Dipper at Luna Park Sydney, Australia from 1995 to 2001
- Big Dipper (Luna Park Sydney, 2021), a single-rail roller coaster currently operating at Luna Park Sydney, Australia

== Sport ==
- Wilt Chamberlain (1936–1999), American basketball player
- Robert DiPierdomenico (born 1958), Australian rules footballer
- Chris Duncan (born 1981), American baseball player

== Music ==
- Big Dipper (band), a 1980s-1990s Boston alternative-rock band
- Big Dipper (rapper), professional name of American rapper Dan Stermer
- The Great Dipper (album), a 2015 album by Roy Kim
- "Big Dipper", a 1978 song by Elton John from the album A Single Man
- "Big Dipper", a song by Jethro Tull from their 1976 album Too Old to Rock 'n' Roll: Too Young to Die!
- "Big Dipper", a song by Built to Spill from their 1994 album There's Nothing Wrong with Love
- "Big Dipper", a song by Cracker from their 1996 album The Golden Age (Cracker album)
- "Big Dipper", a song by Death Grips from their 2015 album The Powers That B

== Other uses ==
- Big Dipper Ice Arena, in Fairbanks, Alaska

== See also ==
- Beidou (disambiguation), Chinese equivalent of the asterism
- Little Dipper (disambiguation)
