= Little Dipper (disambiguation) =

The Little Dipper is a constellation also known as Ursa Minor.

Little Dipper may also refer to:

== Entertainment ==
- "Little Dipper" (Gravity Falls), a 2012 episode of the animated series Gravity Falls
- The Little Dippers, the group later known as the Anita Kerr Singers

== Other ==
- Little Dipper, a dalmatian puppy in 102 Dalmatians
- Lockheed Little Dipper a single-seat monoplane

== Roller coasters ==
- Little Dipper (Memphis Kiddie Park) in Ohio
- Little Dipper (Six Flags Great America) in Illinois
- Little Dipper (Conneaut Lake Park) in Pennsylvania
- Little Dipper (Little Amerricka) in Wisconsin

== See also ==
- Big Dipper (disambiguation)
