= Dipper (brand) =

Indian condom brand

Dipper Condoms
- Company type: Private
- Industry: Condoms
- Founded: 2016
- Area served: India

Dipper is an Indian condom brand marketed by Tata Motors and Rediffusion Y&R to promote safe sex among truck drivers in India. Manufactured by HLL Lifecare, it is part of an award-winning AIDS awareness campaign that was initiated by Tata. The name, "Dipper", was inspired by the iconic message, "Use Dipper at Night" (meaning the recommended usage of dim headlights at night) - that are painted at the back of inter- as well as intrastate trucks in India.

== History ==
It was a NACO idea, created in 2005.

According to studies carried out by the Transport Corporation of India (TCI), out of the two million truck drivers in India who visit sex workers, only about 11 percent of them use protection. It also found that AIDS awareness among the drivers was very low, with about 16 percent of them suffering from some venereal disease.

In April 2016, Tata Motors, one of India's largest truck manufacturers, launched a campaign called "Use Dipper at Night" which was intended to resonate amongst truck drivers who are clueless about unsafe sex and its consequences. In association with creative agency Rediffusion Y&R, latex condom manufacturer HLL Lifecare, and TCI, Tata launched "Khushi Clinics" which carried out distribution of condoms in and around prime locations of truck drivers such as Ludhiana (Punjab), Kanpur (Uttar Pradesh), and Vashi (Maharashtra).

== Production ==
Dipper condoms are manufactured by Hindustan Latex Limited (HLL) Lifecare. For packaging, Rediffusion employed a colourful artwork style used by truck drivers and owners to decorate their trucks, in order to make them appealing to its targeted user base. Called 'truck art' in creative parlance, colourful patterns and pictures that reflected 'highway culture' was used while creating the packets.

In April 2016, a total of 45,000 Dipper condoms were sold by the TCI Foundation in a window of 30 days. Birender Dubey, coordinator of the activity in Vashi, said, "The response was great. Normally, truckers feel shy about buying condoms. But Dipper appealed to their sensibilities. Everything worked in its favour - the price, the packaging, the quality, and most of all, the message 'Use Dipper At Night.' The stock is sold out and we've been getting request for more from drivers and our other clinics ever since."

== Honors ==
In June 2016, Rediffusion Y&R won a Silver Medal Lion for the campaign in the 2016 edition of Media Lions.
