= Dipper (container) =

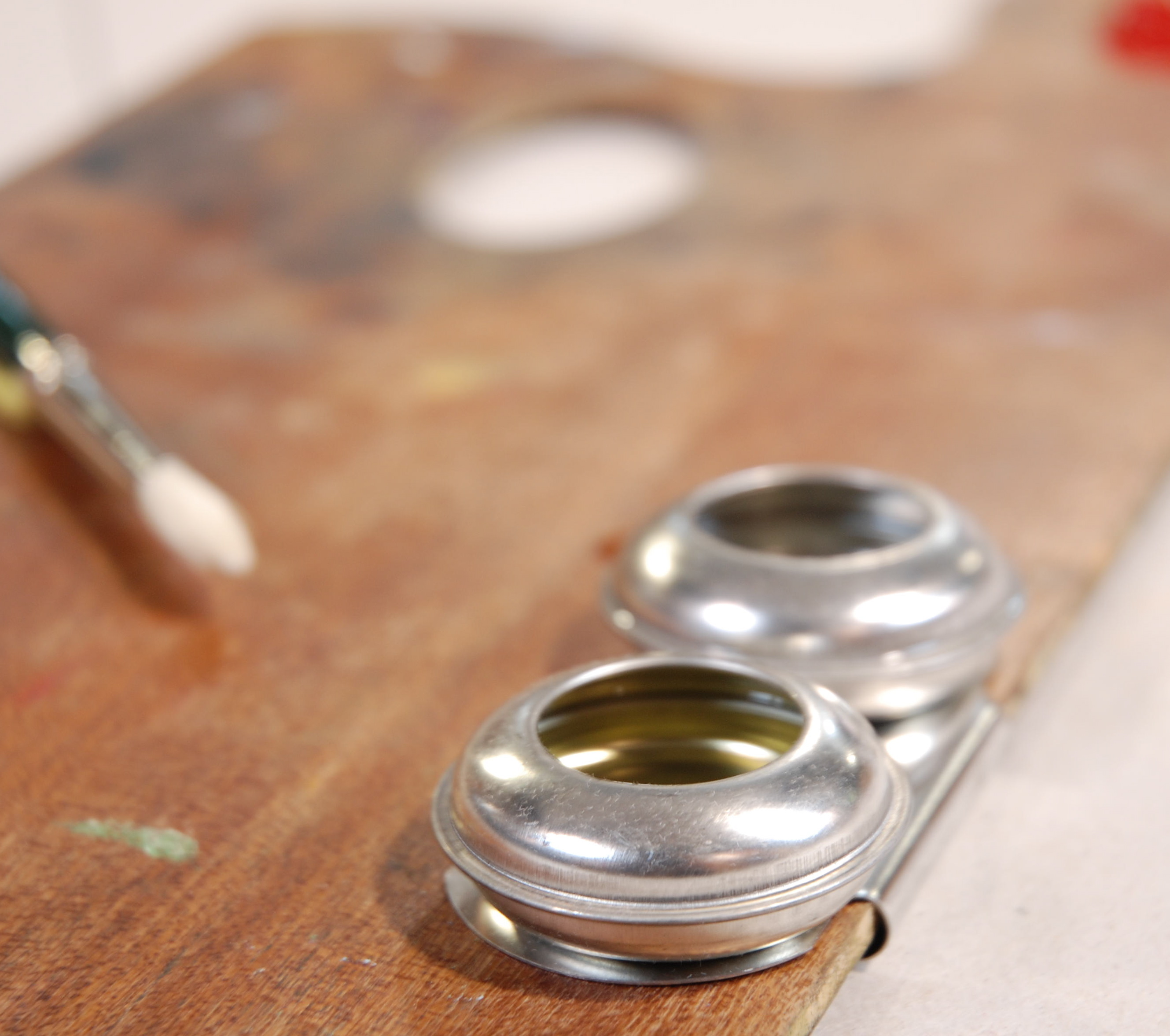
Double dipper

An oil dipper is used to hold a supply of turpentine, oil or painting medium, fastened to the painter's palette.

Used in oil painting, it can be clipped onto the edge of the wooden palette.
