= Spertus Institute for Jewish Learning and Leadership =

Jewish educational center in Chicago

- Other name: Spertus Institute
- Former name: Chicago's College of Jewish Studies
- Type: Graduate, Private not-for-profit
- Established: 1924
- Chairman: Harold Israel
- President: Dr. Dean P. Bell
- Dean: Dr. Keren E. Fraiman
- Total staff: 38
- Students: 130
- Location: 610 S Michigan Ave, Chicago, IL, 60605; 41°52′26″N 87°37′29″W
- Website: www.spertus.edu

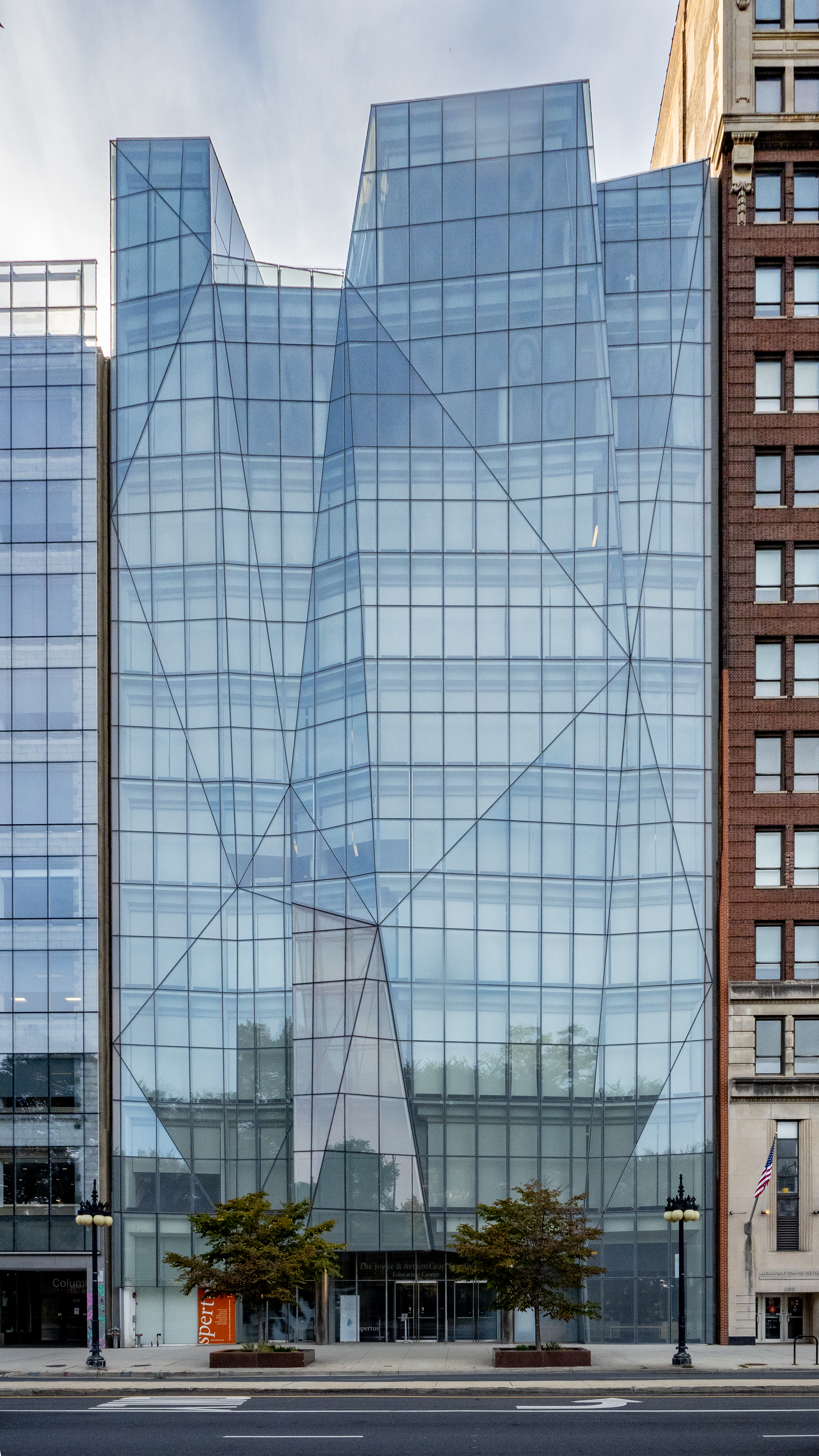
Spertus Institute for Jewish Learning and Leadership

Spertus Institute for Jewish Learning and Leadership (DBA for Spertus College) is an institution of higher Jewish education headquartered in Chicago, Illinois.

It offers learning opportunities that are "rooted in Jewish wisdom and culture and open to all." At its core are graduate degree and certificate programs in which students engage with Jewish ideas in the service of personal growth, community leadership, and professional advancement. These offerings educate Jewish professionals, community leaders, and those pursuing advanced education in Jewish Studies.

Spertus Institute's academic and professional offerings are complemented by public programs, in an array of onsite and online formats.

Spertus Institute is accredited by the Higher Learning Commission.

== History ==
The institute was founded in 1924 as Chicago's College of Jewish Studies. In 1970, its name changed from College of Jewish Studies to Spertus College to honor donations made by brothers Maurice and Herman Spertus. In 1993, the name was changed to Spertus Institute of Jewish Studies. In 2013, the name changed to Spertus Institute for Jewish Learning and Leadership.

=== Notable Faculty and Presenters ===
During and following World War II, many renowned refugee scholars from Nazi-occupied Europe served on the Spertus faculty. Among them were Dr. Fritz Bamberger, who, following his decades teaching philosophy and comparative literature, left academia to run Esquire magazine; and Simon Rawidowicz and Nahum N. Glatzer, who went on to establish the Jewish Studies Department at Brandeis University. Another was Moses Shulvass.

More recently, Rabbi Dr. Byron Sherwin (1946–2015) was director of doctoral programs.

Well-known presenters have included Supreme Court Justice Ruth Bader Ginsburg, author Jonathan Safran Foer, architect Moshe Safdie, hip-hop artist Y-Love, pianist/actor/playwright Hershey Felder, New York Times columnist Thomas Friedman, Psychologist Dr. Tal Ben-Shahar, and statistician Nate Silver.

Honorary degree recipients from 1949 to 2011 have included Rabbi Mordecai M. Kaplan, former Israeli Ambassador to the United States Abba Eban, Rabbi Abraham Joshua Heschel, author and Nobel Peace Prize Laureate Elie Wiesel, author and Nobel Literature Laureate Isaac Bashevis Singer, feminist author Betty Friedan, actor Leonard Nimoy, and Hazzan Alberto Mizrahi.

== Architecture of the Spertus Institute building ==
In November 2007, Spertus Institute opened a noteworthy new facility at 610 S. Michigan Avenue. Designed by Chicago-based Krueck Sexton Partners, the building features interconnected interior spaces and an unusual ten-story faceted window wall that offers views of the Chicago skyline, Grant Park, and Lake Michigan. This window wall is built from 726 individual pieces of glass in 556 different shapes. The building houses classrooms, offices, a library, a 400-seat theater, and a variety of open event spaces.

The Spertus building was the first new construction in the Historic Michigan Boulevard District after the area was designated a Chicago Landmark in 2002. The cost of the Spertus project was approximately $50 million ($77.6 million in 2025).

The building has been recognized with a number of awards, including the Distinguished Building Award and Divine Detail Award from the American Institute of Architects's Chicago Chapter and Best Building of the Year from Interior Design Magazine.

== See also ==
- List of Jewish universities and colleges in the United States
- Hebrew Theological College: Jewish seminary in Skokie
- Illinois Holocaust Museum and Education Center: Museum in Skokie
- History of the Jews in Chicago
