= Honey dipper =

Tool to collect and dispense honey or syrup

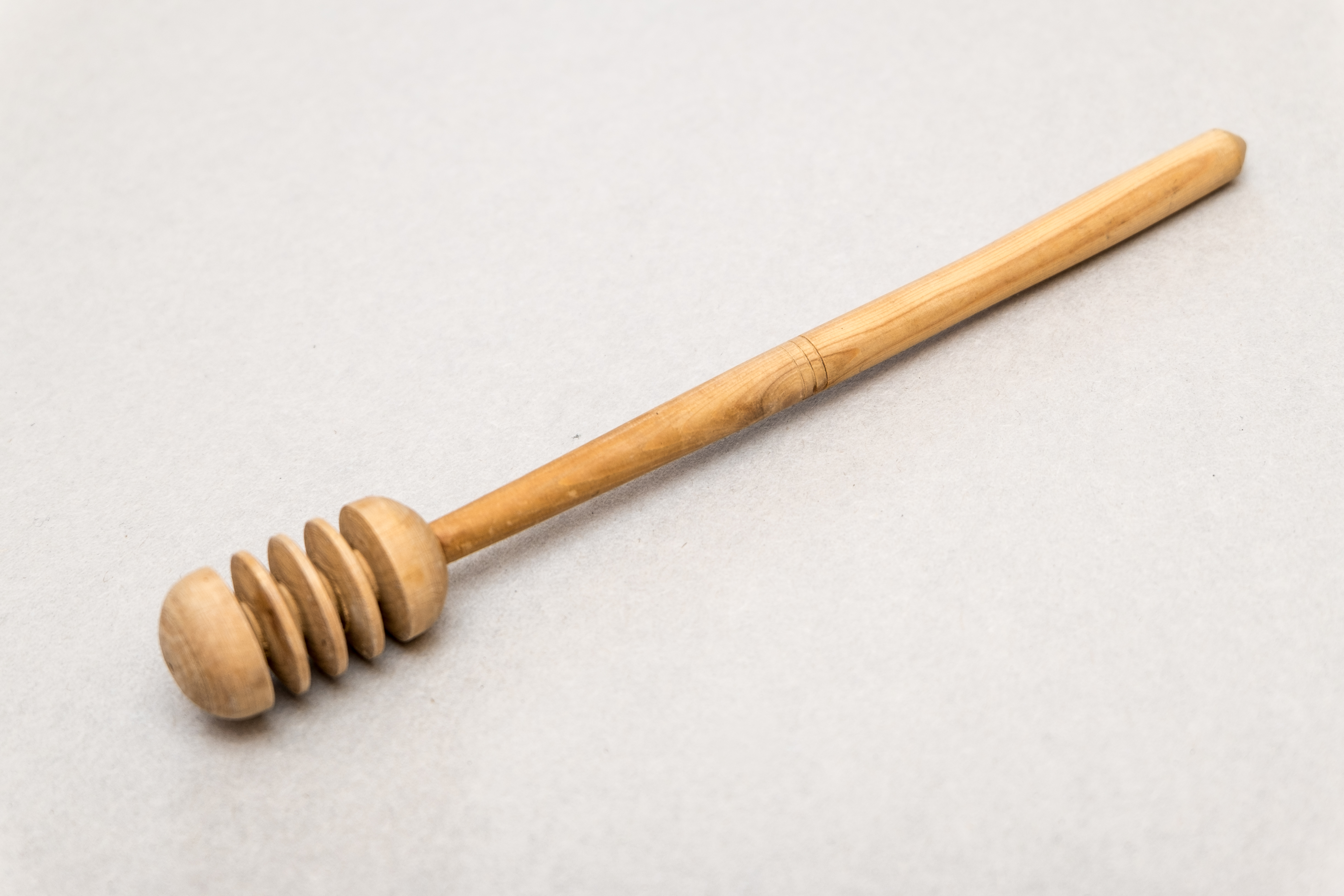
A wooden honey dipper

A honey dipper (also called a honey dripper, honey wand, honey stick, honey spoon, or honey drizzler) is a kitchen utensil used to collect viscous liquid (generally honey or syrup) from a container, which is then dispensed at another location.

== Description ==
The tool is often made of turned wood. Besides the handle, the tool consists of equally spaced grooves. Often, the grooves descend in circumference on each new groove.

The utensil is sometimes made of plastic, stainless steel, silver-plated brass, silicone, ceramic, or glass. Some users prefer wood or another soft material, which is less likely to chip a glass or porcelain cup.

== Use ==
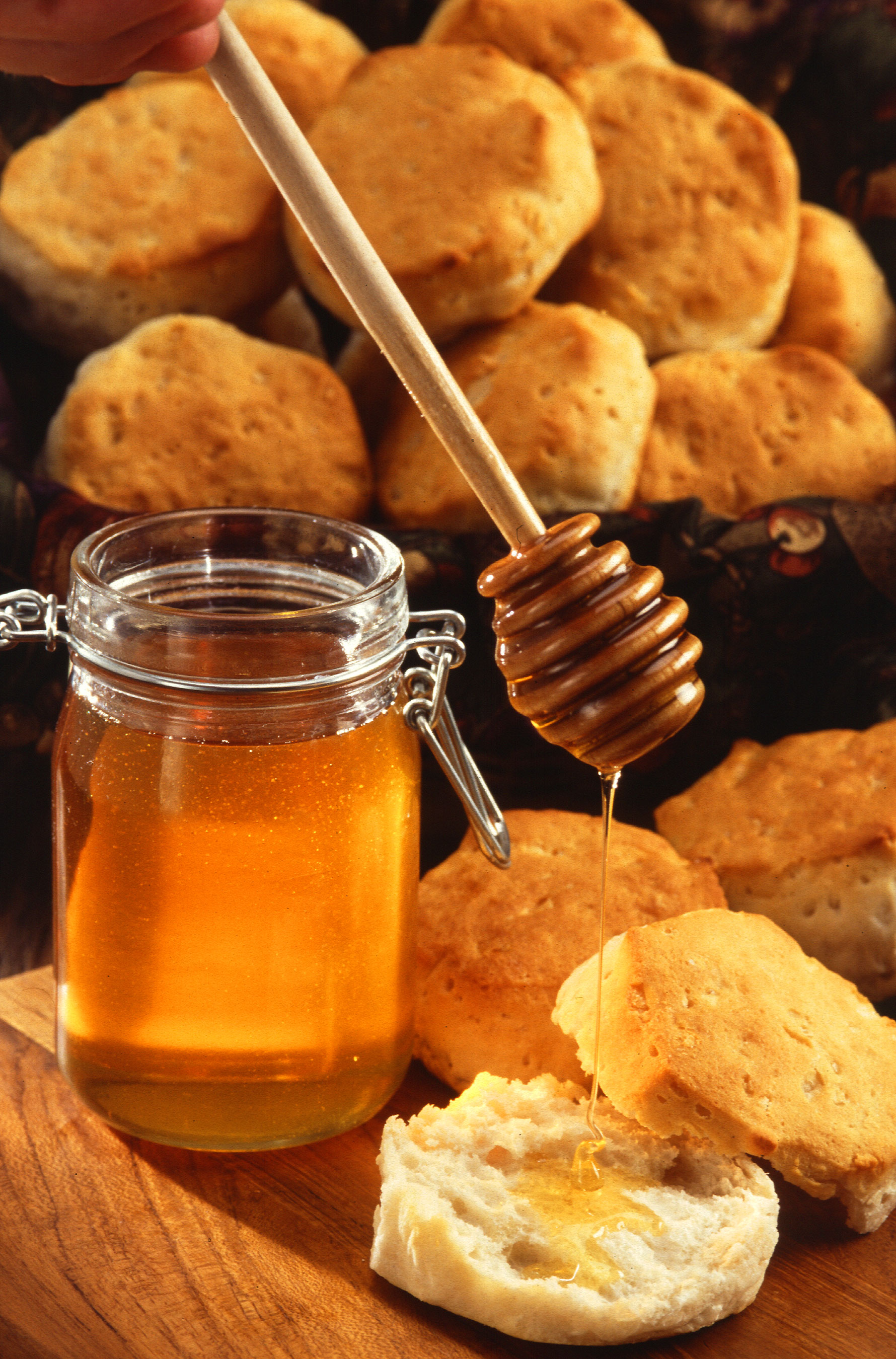
A honey dipper in use

One method of using the tool is to dip the grooved end into the liquid, rotate the handle into a horizontal position, then slowly twirl the handle between the thumb and fingers while in transport, as the concentric grooves help to minimize dripping. When the twirling motion is stopped, the honey will collect on the lower parts of the tool and drip off, thus dispensing the honey.

The tool is commonly used to drizzle honey on bread, biscuits, or other foods of that nature.

== In popular culture ==
The mascot of Honey Nut Cheerios, "BuzzBee", has carried various incarnations of honey dippers. Winnie-the-Pooh toys by Mattel have featured a honey dipper alongside the bear.

== Alternative term usage ==
Since the 1920s, the term "honey dipper" has been used as a euphemism for the workers who empty septic tanks, clean latrines, and do similar work. (Note: There are many other terms for people doing this work; see the history of manual scavenging and the history of sanitation.)
