= Water feature =

Artificial construct that prominently displays water for decorative purposes

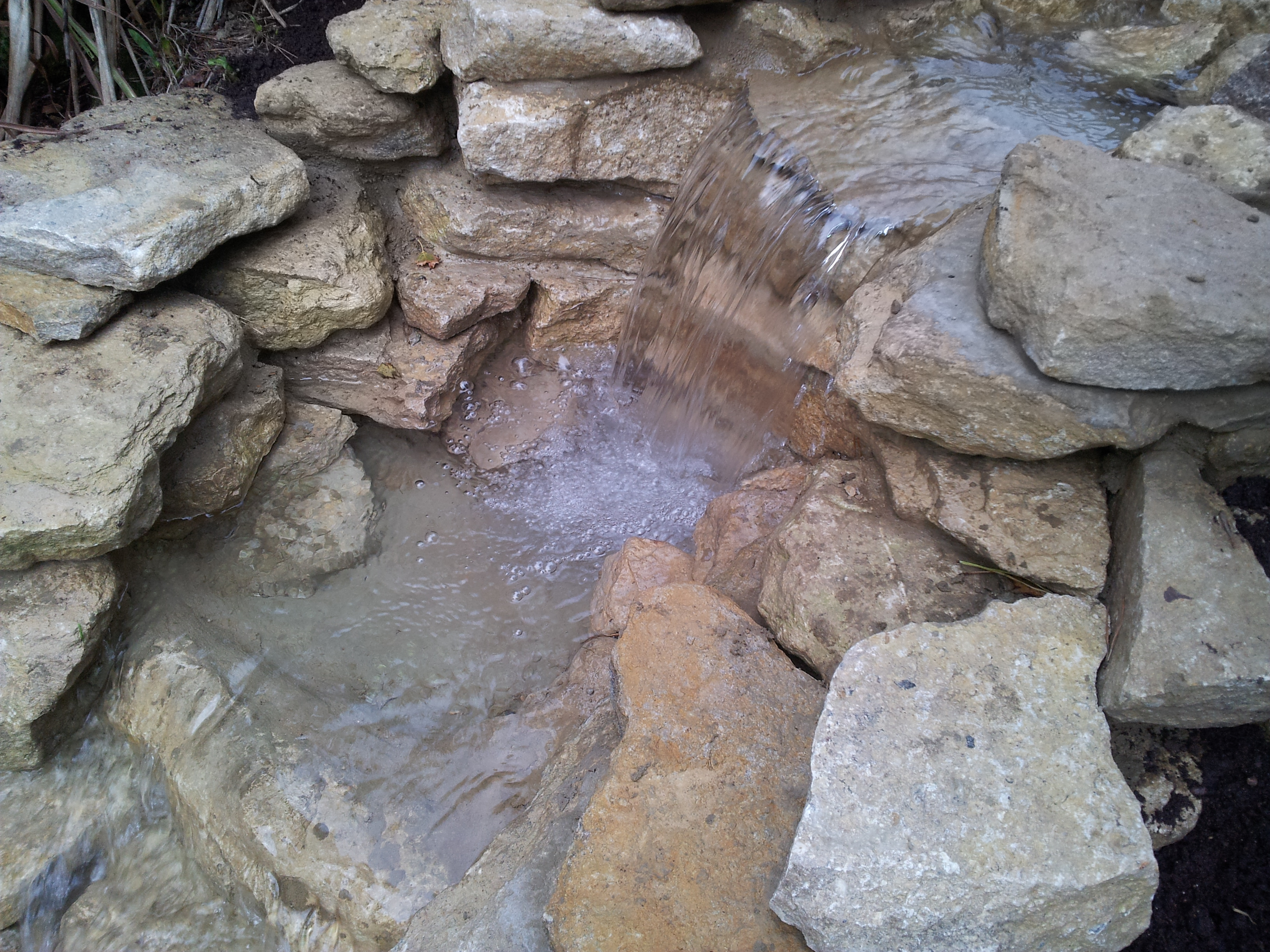
Water feature stone waterfall. Cascading water over natural rock to form a natural hillside water feature.

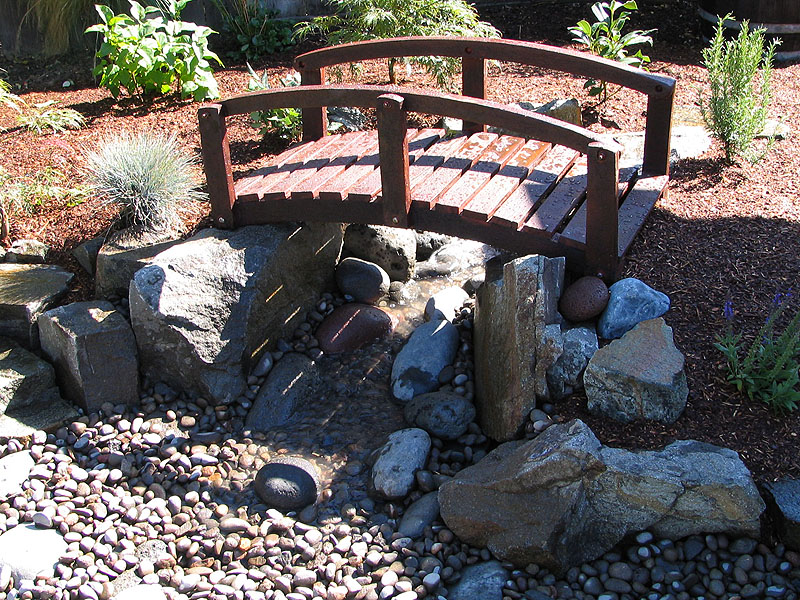
A small pondless water feature in Jacksonville, Oregon, United States. The water reservoir and pump are located beneath some rock out of sight

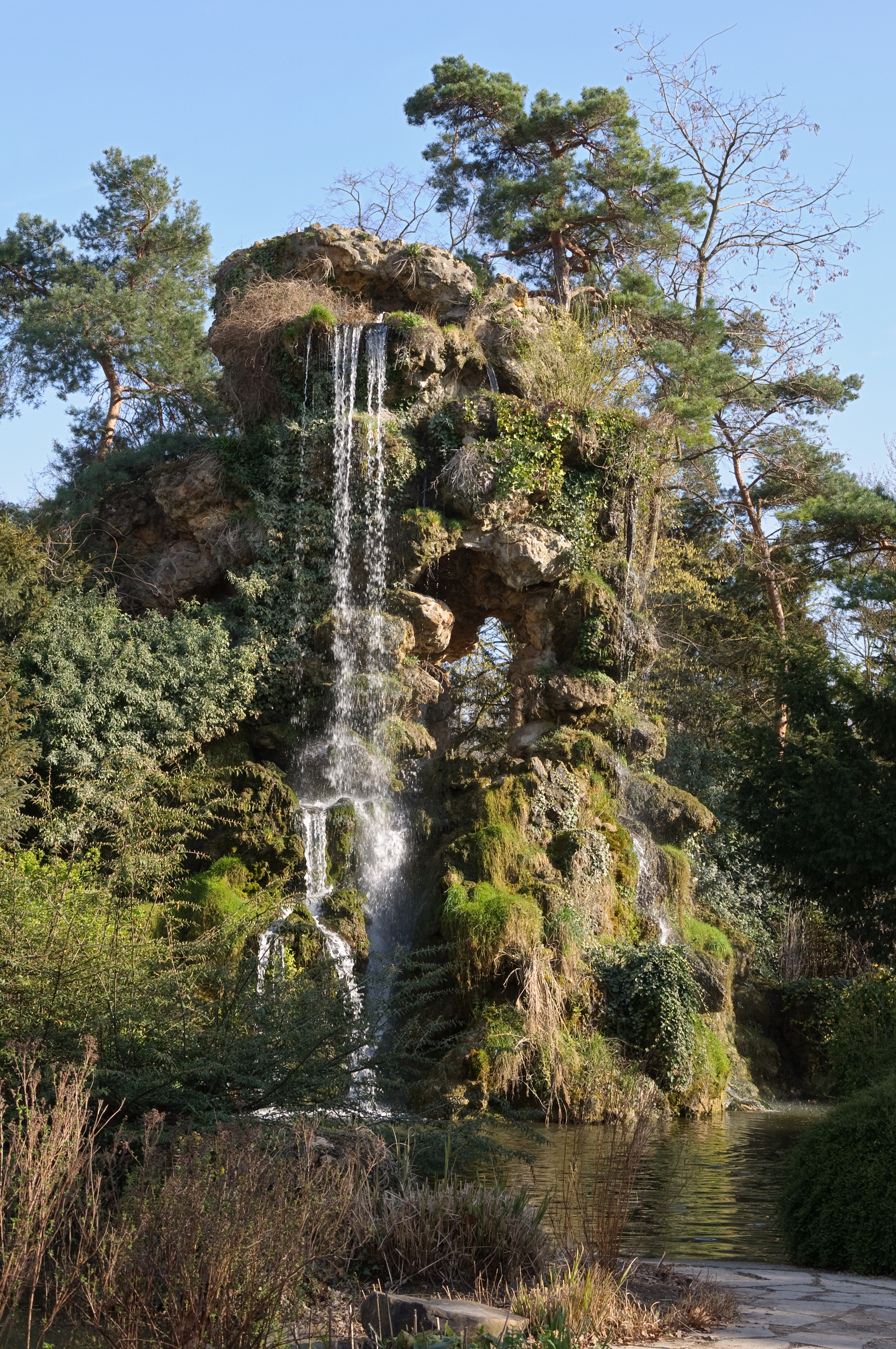
Artificial waterfall in the park of Bagatelle, France.

Computerized musical water feature in National Harbor, MD

In landscape architecture and garden design, a water feature is one or more items from a range of fountains, jeux d'eau, pools, ponds, rills, artificial waterfalls, and streams. Before the 18th century they were usually powered by gravity, though the famous Hanging Gardens of Babylon are described by Strabo as supplied by an Archimedean screw and other examples were supplied with water using hydraulic rams.

Ancient water features were powered using gravitational forces, human power or animals to pump in the water. Since the 18th century, the majority of water features have been powered by pumps. In the past, the power source was sometimes a steam engine, but in modern features it is almost always powered by electricity. There is an increasing range of innovative designs as the market becomes more established and people become more aware of alternate installation methods, such as solar power. The advantages of using solar power include environmental benefits, no electrical lines in the garden, and free energy.

Modern water features are typically self-contained, meaning that they do not require water to be plumbed in; rather water is recycled from either a pond or a hidden reservoir, also known as a sump. The sump can either be contained within the water feature, or buried underground (in the case of an outdoor water feature).

In contemporary landscape architecture, water features are not only decorative but also play an important role in improving environmental quality. They can help regulate temperature in urban areas, reduse noise pollution, and create more comfortable public spaces. Additionally, water elements are often integrated into sustainable design strategies, such as rainwater collection and reusse systems.

A water feature may be indoor or outdoor and can range in size from a desk top water fountain to a large indoor waterfall that covers an entire wall in a large building, and can be made from any number of materials, including stone, stainless steel, resin, iron and glass. Most water features are electronically controlled, ranging from simple timer actuators to sophisticated computerized controls for synchronizing music to water and light animation.

Water features often offer additional benefits to homeowners, such as increased curb appeal, home value, reduced noise pollution (due to the sound of water overpowering outside noise), increased humidity in dry regions and improved air quality.

== History ==
In early modern Europe, fountains were found in the elaborate gardens of the mansions of the wealthy, and in modern times can be an element in urban design provided by the municipal authorities or public subscription. Water features are often found in gardens of middle class houses.

A notable modern example is the Diana, Princess of Wales Memorial Fountain in London, England.

== Types of water features ==
- Categories
  - Natural water feature
  - Man-made water feature
  - Naturalistic water feature
  - Disappearing water feature
  - Live water feature
  - Sterile water feature
- Pools and ponds
  - Fish pond
  - Formal pool
  - Garden pond
  - Koi pond
  - Lake
  - Lotus pool
  - Naturalistic pond
  - Plunge pool
  - Reflecting pool
  - Shallow pool/tide pool
  - Stream pool
  - Swimming pond
  - Swimming pool
  - Wildlife pond/habitat pond
- Water courses
  - Brooks
  - Creeks
  - Streams
  - Rivers
  - Runnel
  - Rill
  - Wild river
- Fountains
  - Bubbler fountain
  - Disappearing fountain
  - Drinking fountain
  - Floating fountain
  - Formal fountain
  - Jeux d'eau
  - Kugel fountain
  - Spitter fountain
  - Tabletop fountain
  - Wall fountain
- Water falls
  - Artificial waterfall
  - Chadar – a textured water ramp of Indian origin.
  - Weeping wall
  - Water wall
  - Water stair
  - Water ramp
- Cultivation
  - Hydroponics
  - Rice paddy
- Habitats
  - Wildlife garden – with water-source component.
  - Bogs
  - Wetlands
  - Mangrove swamp habitat
  - Bog garden
  - Rain garden/bio retention system/rain harvesting
  - Aquatic container garden
  - Riparian zone restoration
- Water sources
  - Spring (hydrology)
  - Seep (hydrology)

== See also ==
- Crystal Fountains
- Hercules monument (Kassel) – water feature built in 1714
- Musical fountain
- Rain chain
- Water garden
