= The Black Ball (gala) =

Annual fundraising dance for the Keep a Child Alive charity

The Black Ball is an annual fundraiser gala for Keep a Child Alive, the non-profit organization which brings dignified treatment, care and support to children and families affected by HIV. Keep a Child Alive's (KCA) Black Ball brings celebrity and philanthropy together to fulfill hopes, dreams and raise funds for children and families affected by HIV in Kenya, Rwanda, South Africa, Uganda and India. Hosted by KCA co-founder Alicia Keys, this event takes place in New York and has raised over $18.5 million since 2004. The evening features a cocktail party, seated dinner, live auction and unique musical performances and collaborations. The Black Ball is held annually in New York City and has been produced by Empire Entertainment. The Black Ball gala has also been held in London, England in 2008, 2010 and 2011.

Every year, artists and other celebrities come together to support and perform to raise funds for the cause. The Black Ball has featured performances from an array of artists including David Bowie, Bono, Patti Smith, Annie Lennox, Mary J. Blige, Jay-Z, John Mayer, Beyonce, Adele, Justin Timberlake, Carole King, and Roy Ayers. Activists and philanthropists have also been honored at the Black Ball, including Oprah, former president Bill Clinton, Clive Davis, Youssou N'Dour, Sir Richard Branson, and Bono. According to Keys, the Black Ball held in 2014 raised around 2.4 million dollars.

== 2012 ==
The 9th Annual KCA Black Ball NY originally scheduled for November 1 at the Hammerstein Ballroom in New York City, was rescheduled due to Hurricane Sandy. The event was re-envisioned and took place on December 6 at the world-famous Apollo Theater and Emceed by Whoopi Goldberg. Performances were given by Alicia Keys, Jennifer Hudson, Angelique Kidjo, Bonnie Raitt and Brittany Howard of Alabama Shakes . KCA honored the philanthropic work of Oprah Winfrey and Angelique Kidjo.

== 2011 ==
The 8th Annual KCA Black Ball NY was held at the Hammerstein Ballroom in New York City on November 3, 2011. Performances were given by Alicia Keys, Usher, Norah Jones, will.i.am, Richie Sambora, Gary Clark Jr, Jay Sean and Midival Punditz with Karsh Kale. KCA honored the spiritual, musical and philanthropic legacy of George Harrison. The event was sponsored by Sachin & Saurbah Foundation, United Airlines and Sherry-Lehmann Wine & Spirits.

== 2011 ==
The 3rd KCA Black Ball London was held at the Roundhouse on June 15, 2011 and hosted and musically directed by Alicia Keys and Mark Ronson. Performances included Alicia Keys, Mark Ronson, Tinie Tempah, Paloma Faith, Beth Ditto, Kyle Falconer, Spank Rock and the legendary Boy George.

== 2010 ==
The 7th Annual KCA Black Ball NY was held at the Hammerstein Ballroom in New York City on September 30, 2010. Performances were given by Alicia Keys, Janelle Monáe, Sade and Jay-Z. The event was sponsored by COVERGIRL, Bing and Sherry-Lehmann Wine & Spirits and produced by Empire Entertainment.

== 2010 ==
The 2nd Annual KCA Black Ball London was held at St. John's Smith Square in London on May 27, 2010 hosted by Alicia Keys and Thandie Newton. Performances were given by Alicia Keys, Bryan Ferry and Kasabian.

== 2009 ==
The 6th Annual KCA Black Ball NY was held at the Hammerstein Ballroom in New York City on October 15, 2009. Performances were given by Alicia Keys, John Mayer, Youssou N'Dour and Chris Martin from Coldplay. KCA honored Sir Richard Branson, President Bill Clinton and Youssou N'Dour. The event was sponsored by ARISE magazine, Moet Hennessy and Google and produced by Obo.

== 2008 ==
The 5th Annual KCA Black Ball NY was held at the Hammerstein Ballroom in New York City on November 13, 2008. Performances were given by Alicia Keys, Justin Timberlake, Adele, Daughtry, and Emmanuel Jahl. KCA honored Jackie Branfield, Simon Fuller and Queen Latifah. The event was sponsored by Condé Nast Media Group and produced by Empire Entertainment.

== 2008 ==
Keep a Child Alive's Black Ball London premiered at St. John's Smith Square in London on July 10, 2008 hosted by Alicia Keys. Performances from Annie Lennox, Jennifer Hudson, Adele, Damian Marley, Julian Marley & Emmanuel Jal. The event was sponsored by The Sekhar Foundation.

== 2007 ==
The 4th Annual KCA Black Ball NY was held in New York City on October 25, 2007. Musical performances were given by Gwen Stefani, Sheryl Crow, Alicia Keys, the Agape Orphanage's children's Choir, and Bono. Honorees included Nick Reding, Kenya and Dr. Pasquine Ogunsanya, Uganda, and Bono. Amy Sacco teamed with Empire Entertainment to produce the Bungalow 8 Ballroom after party.

== 2006 ==
The 3rd Annual KCA Black Ball was held in New York City on November 9, 2006. Hosts Alicia Keys and Iman were joined by KCA founder Leigh Blake, emcee Wanda Sykes, and honorees Richard Beckman, Dr. Paul Farmer and Partners in Health, and "Mama" Carol Dyanti. Musical performances were featured by Alicia Keys, Damian Marley, Louis XIV, and David Bowie, in his last public performance before his death in 2016.

== 2005 ==
The 2nd Annual KCA Black Ball was held in Jazz at Lincoln Center in New York City on November 3, 2005. Alicia Keys performed songs with John Mayer, Common, Paul Simon and the Children of Agape, Baaba Maal, Usher, Angelique Kidjo, Femi Kuti, and Bono.

== 2004 ==
The First Annual KCA Black Ball (then known as the Pusher's Ball) was held at the Angel Orensanz Center on December 1, 2004 in New York City.
