= Expolight =

Ukrainian lighting design studio

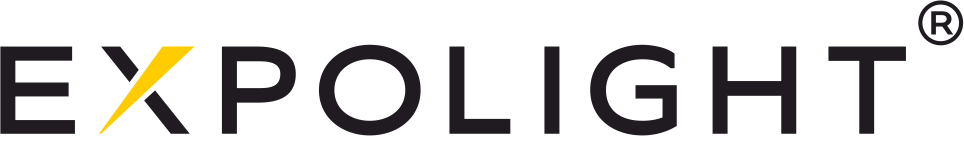

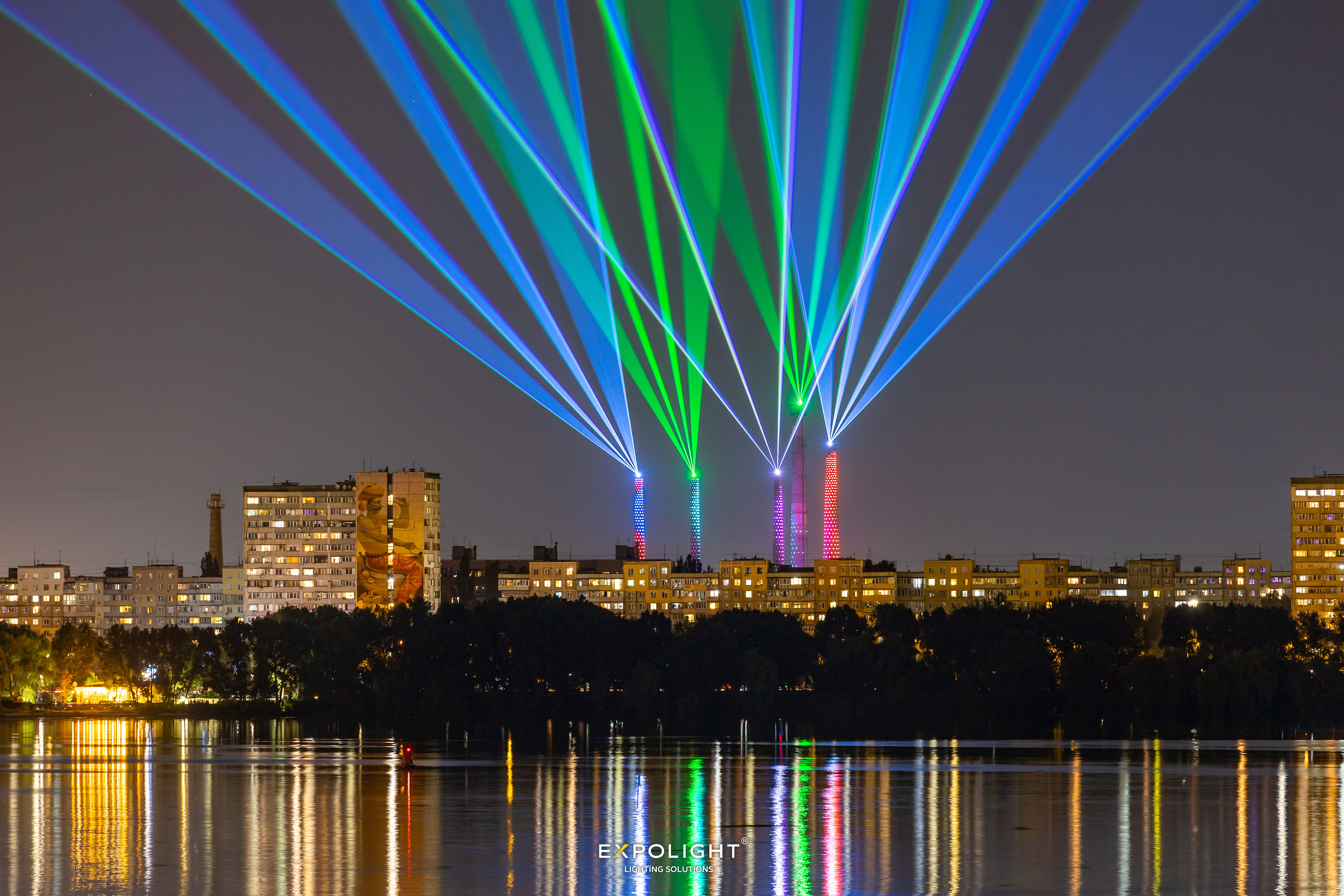
- Industry: lighting design
- Founded: 2000
- Founder: Mykola Kabluka
- Headquarters: Dnipro
- Website: expolight.net

Expolight is a Ukrainian lighting design and media art studio founded by Mykola Kabluka in 2000 in Dnipro. The studio specializes in architectural lighting, light installations, media art, media façades, and participatory projects.

== History and activities ==
Expolight specializes in bespoke lighting and media solutions for public and private spaces. The studio delivers full-cycle projects, from concept development, architectural design, and artistic direction to engineering, production, installation, and technical support. The company also operates a research center that develops technological solutions, lighting equipment, custom luminaires, and software for lighting control systems.

Over the course of its work, Expolight has completed more than 1,500 projects in various countries, including the United States, India, China, Morocco, Spain, the United Kingdom, Italy, and Germany.

Among the architectural and design studios with which the company has collaborated are Zaha Hadid Architects, driendl Architects, Avro|Ko, UNStudio, YOD Studio, Balbek Bureau, YODEZEEN, ZIKZAK Architects, MAKHNO Studio, and Yakusha Design.

== Projects ==
=== International projects ===
- architectural lighting for TBC Bank (Georgia)
- the media art installation Yerevan TV Tower (Armenia, 2025)
- a custom chandelier and lighting for the restaurant Molfar (Belgium, 2025)
- lighting solutions for the restaurant YOY neo bistro (United Arab Emirates, 2025)
- lighting for the office of the film production company Dynamic Frame (Switzerland, 2024)
- lighting design for the digital art gallery 37x Dubai (United Arab Emirates, 2023)
- lighting solutions for the restaurant Kinkally (London, 2023)
- interior lighting for Hard Rock Cafe Yerevan (Armenia, 2022)
- interior lighting for Buddha-Bar (New York City, United States, 2021)
- interior lighting for Axis Towers (Georgia, 2020)
- interior lighting for the restaurant TAINO and Yopo Tiki Bar (Dominican Republic, 2019)

=== Projects in Ukraine ===
- lighting design for the Therapeutic Garden at the Expocenter of Ukraine (Kyiv, 2025)
- façade and gallery lighting, as well as an interactive VR room for ZAG Gallery (Lviv, 2025)
- Tatar Bunar restaurant (Odesa, 2024)
- landscape and interior lighting for Emily Resort (Lviv, 2022)
- Saga City Space residential complex (Kyiv, 2022)
- lighting for park of culture and rest named by M.O.Hurov (Mariupol, 2021)
- a 3D media hologram on the screen of the Gulliver shopping mall (Kyiv, 2021)
- the interactive laser and projection show Transformations Through History on Khortytsia Island (Zaporizhzhia, 2021)
- the Symbolic Synagogue at Babyn Yar (Kyiv, 2021)
- the light art installation Dnipro Light Flowers (Dnipro, 2020)
- the Interactive Boulevard of Arts on Korolenko Street (Dnipro, 2020)
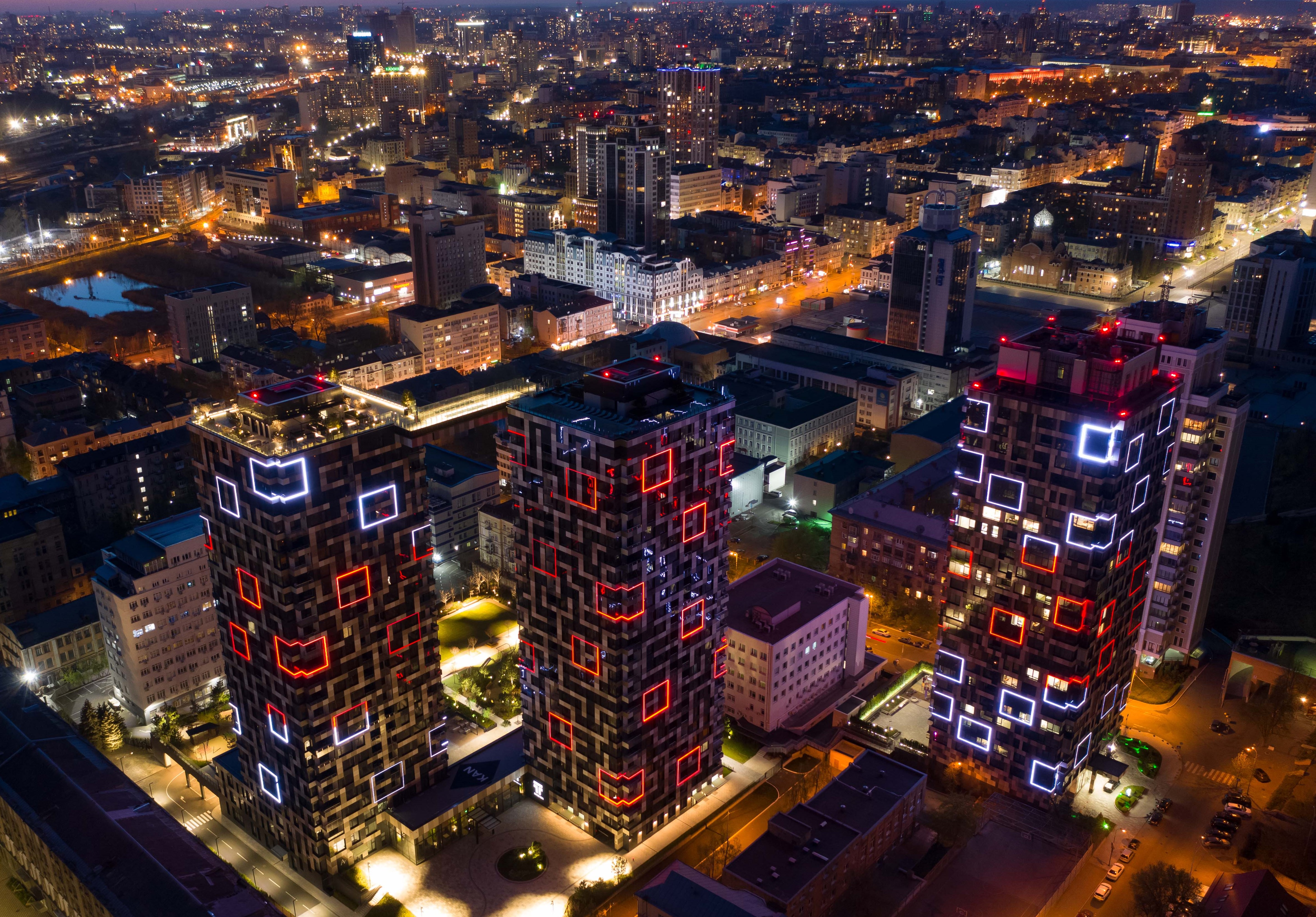
  Tetris Hall (Kyiv, 2019)
  lighting and multimedia design for Freedom Square (Mariupol, 2020) the media sculpture Cube at the Chicago Central House residential complex (Kyiv, 2019)
- illumination of St. Nicholas Roman Catholic Church (Kyiv, 2019)
- the Lighthouse installation at UNIT.City (Kyiv, 2019)
- lighting design for the Smartass sports club (Kyiv, 2019)
- the media façade and lighting design for the interiors and landscape areas of the Tetris Hall residential complex (Kyiv, 2019)

=== Social projects ===
==== Support for medical workers during the lockdown ====
In 2020, during the first COVID-19 lockdown in Ukraine, Expolight launched a social project in support of medical workers. The team also helped establish a charitable foundation to raise funds for their treatment. As part of the campaign, a number of landmarks in Kyiv, Odesa, and Dnipro were illuminated in red and white, colours associated with medicine. The campaign was intended to draw attention to the issue and direct potential donors to the project website.

==== Campaign for International Rare Disease Day ====
In 2021, as part of the global observance of International Rare Disease Day, Expolight, in partnership with the civic union Rare Diseases of Ukraine, organized the campaign There Are Many with Rare Diseases! Rare Means Strong!. Over a period of ten days, 16 buildings in five Ukrainian cities – Kyiv, Odesa, Lviv, Dnipro, and Mariupol – were illuminated in the symbolic colours associated with the day: blue, green, and pink.

==== The Unity Day ====
On 16 February 2022, the Expolight team took part in the state campaign marking the Unity Day by illuminating a number of its projects across Ukraine in blue and yellow. In Dnipro, the Dnipro Light Flowers installation was illuminated in the national colours. The installation is equipped with 5,500 light pixels and lasers with a range of up to 10 kilometres. The light art installation on five former factory chimneys formed the world's largest Ukrainian flag.

==== Activities during the Russian invasion of Ukraine ====
Following the start of Russia's full-scale invasion of Ukraine in 2022, the Expolight team participated in converting underground parking facilities in shopping centres in Dnipro into shelters. This included installing lighting, electrical outlets, and heating. Together with the architects Serhii Filimonov and Natalia Kashyrina, the team also helped produce 300 sets of thermal underwear for Ukrainian military personnel.

== Awards ==
Expolight's projects have received more than 70 international awards and more than 30 honorable mentions in the field of lighting design, including the IES Illumination Awards, the LIT Design Awards, and the IALD International Lighting Design Awards. Recognized projects include Tetris Hall, Dnipro Light Flowers, the Interactive Boulevard of Arts, the Symbolic Synagogue at Babyn Yar, Freedom Square in Mariupol, Buddha-Bar New York, park of culture and rest named by M.O.Hurov, Saga City Space, as well as a number of restaurants, residential developments, and public spaces in Ukraine and abroad.
