= Yodezeen =

Architecture and interior design studio

- Type: Private
- Industry: Architecture and Interior Design
- Founded: 2010
- Founders: Artur Sharf, Artem Zverev
- Headquarters: London, UK; Dubai, UAE; Miami, USA; Kyiv, Ukraine
- Area served: Worldwide
- Website: https://yodezeen.com

Yodezeen is an international architecture and interior design studio specializing in high-end projects with offices in London, Dubai, Miami, Kyiv, Warsaw, Milan and Los Angeles.

Between 2019 and 2024, the studio was recognized by the American Architecture Awards, Dezeen, the Architecture MasterPrize, SBID etc.

== Overview ==
Yodezeen was established by Artur Sharf and Artem Zverev in 2010 in Kyiv, Ukraine. Over the years, the studio expanded its operations globally and shifted from residential design to larger-scale projects, including resorts, yachts, restaurants, hotels. By 2025, Yodezeen operates across 33 countries. The company began developing projects in Asia, including India, China, Japan, and in South America, and Africa.

== Projects ==
=== Europe ===
Having presented many residences spanning the French Riviera, Spain, and the Alps and other prime locations, in 2023 Yodezeen have built their flagman architecture project — Sierra House. Sierra House was released as a private residence in the Kyiv region, Ukraine. The design, according to the architecture magazine Designboom, combines bold modern aesthetics with raw materials like basalt, corten, and glass, showcasing exceptional craftsmanship that merges art and architecture. In June 2024, Yodezeen designed the Milk Bar Warsaw, a modern interpretation of Poland's bar mleczny, located in the Elektrownia Powiśl.

In December 2024, Yodezeen designed YDF Interiors' "Living Concept" flagship showroom in London. Yodezeen designed the new ALBA restaurant on Brompton Road in Knightsbridge, London. The design features a coastal Italian theme with a palette of olive greens, lemon yellows, and terracotta, complemented by real citrus trees and a handmade Venetian floor.

=== USA ===
Yodezeen designed LaNoma, a family-friendly Italian restaurant in New Jersey. Set to open in July 2024, it focuses on creating a versatile space that combines casual brunches and more refined dining experiences.

In Miami, Yodezeen completed several high-end residences at The Ritz-Carlton, each reflecting a unique take on contemporary coastal living with panoramic views and bespoke interiors studio also designed a custom private villa in Golden Beach.

=== Middle East & South Asia ===
In February 2024, Yodezeen designed a ‘Super Penthouse’, a large ( 77,707 square metres) and luxurious penthouse in Dubai, in collaboration with Raffles, a globall hospitality group with a history dating back to 1887.

In July, Yodezeen collaborated with Atoll Estates to design the luxurious beachfront residences at Zamani Islands in the Maldives, located in the South Malé Atoll.

Yodezeen has created a concept of a resort located on Nurai Island, a 42-hectare private island near Abu Dhabi. The studio is responsible for both architecture and interior design of 53 private villas, apartment buildings, beach clubs, restaurants, etc.

In January 2025, Yodezeen released a design of the interior of "Dragonfly," an Asian restaurant at The Lana Promenade by Dorchester Collection in Dubai.

=== Other ===
In August 2023, Turkey-based Alia Yachts announced the sale and construction of a new 43-meter superyacht 'Ximena', with interiors designed by Yodezeen. The yacht features a main saloon with sliding glass doors, seamlessly blending indoor and outdoor spaces and enhancing airflow.

== Awards ==
In 2019–2021, the studio won multiple Architecture MasterPrize awards and the LIV Hospitality Design Award for its hospitality projects. At the same year, Virgin Izakaya Bar was also shortlisted for the Dezeen Awards.

In 2023, the studio won the SBID International Design Award for the Omniyat Sales Pavilion and the International Hotel & Property Awards by design et al. for the Al Fresco Restaurant while also being shortlisted for the Restaurant & Bar Design Awards.

In 2024, two of Yodezeen's projects in the Private Homes category Golden Residence in Golden Beach, Florida, and Montane Ranch in Aspen, Colorado, were recognized at American Architecture Awards 2024.

In 2024, the studio won the SBID International Design Award for the design of YDF Interiors Showroom.
