= Bungalow 8 =

Nightclub chain

Coordinates: 40°45′02.8″N 74°00′11.1″W

Bungalow 8 was an exclusive nightclub chain with locations in Manhattan's West Side, London's West End, and Amsterdam's nightlife neighborhood Leidseplein. The New York location in particular was popular with celebrities in the early 2000s. Frequent guests included George Clooney, Bill Clinton, Paris Hilton, Lindsay Lohan, Zelda Kaplan, David Beckham, Peter Crouch and Nicole Richie. In the interest of privacy, Bungalow 8 had a strict no photography rule.

== Locations ==
=== New York ===
Amy Sacco opened Bungalow 8 in 2001 in a small garage in Chelsea, Manhattan with décor inspired by the bungalows at The Beverly Hills Hotel. The club closed annually for renovations, which in part fed frequent speculation that Sacco was selling or closing the business. The club's popularity peaked between 2005 and 2007 before closing in 2009 under the guise of renovations. It was never directly announced that Bungalow 8 was permanently closed. The brand was purchased in 2012 by LDV Hospitality and plans to reopen in another location were set into motion. LDV filed for a liquor license as a gastropub rather than as a club or lounge and were careful to keep the name Bungalow 8 under wraps, as Sacco had problems with neighborhood complaints at the previous location. When the Community Board learned the new addition to the neighborhood was indeed Bungalow 8, they pushed back, leading to their liquor license being temporarily frozen. After back-and-forth between LDV and the Community Board, LDV opened under a different name, No. 8, having agreed not to hire Sacco as a consultant, publicist, contractor, or employee. Despite this, Sacco hosted a number of exclusive parties, informally under the Bungalow 8 banner, and several Community Board members saw her working on-site nightly. Since the business still called itself a gastropub, LDV was able to circumvent neighborhood expectations for nightclubs and lounges. No. 8 again faced pushback due to community concerns about insufficient security for the number of guests and about garbage left out overnight. Despite this, No. 8 remained open until 2016.

=== London ===
Sacco opened a second location in London's Covent Garden area at the St Martins Lane Hotel in 2007. Unlike its New York counterpart, this club was designed to be members-only. It lost its license in 2011 and closed.

=== Amsterdam ===
Bungalow 8 opened in Amsterdam in 2009 in the nightlife-heavy Leidseplein area. The new location was designed by Winka Dubbeldam. It closed in 2013.

=== Sydney ===
Bungalow 8 opened in Sydney in 2003. Located at the edge of a wharf in Sydney Harbour the interior of Bungalow 8 was designed as a 'pacific' taverna. Conceived as a sea of yellow light reflecting off a black split bamboo texture the interior space mediates the intensity of the Australian sunlight by day and becomes a magical painting by night with a dance floor that attracts the best movers and shakers in the region.

=== Pop-ups ===
Sacco held a number of Bungalow 8 pop-ups at festivals including the Venice Film Festival starting in 2010, the Toronto International Film Festival, the Sundance Film Festival, and the Cannes Film Festival. In 2013, Beulah London and Bungalow 8 collaborated on a pop-up at the Belgraves Hotel on Chesham Place ahead of London Fashion Week. The Venice Biennale, Art Basel, and the Oscars have also been followed by Bungalow 8 events.

== In popular culture ==
In the fourth season (2002) of Sex and the City, Carrie refers to Bungalow 8 as a "completely pretentious, members-only, tiny, crowded club that you need a key to get into." The same year, P. Diddy's Coast 2 Coast remix of "Welcome to Atlanta" includes the lyrics: "Sunday, we layin' low at the Halo, sippin' Cris and we straight/Monday, we go to Bungalow 8." Lauren Weisberger' 2005 novel Everyone Worth Knowing is set primarily at Bungalow 8 in New York and the pilot episode of Gossip Girl, Serena refers to dancing on the tables at Bungalow 8. In 2008, the film August shows the main character waking up at Bungalow 8 on 9/11 and a fifth season episode of The Office has Pam Beesly joking about going to Bungalow 8 with John Mayer. The nightclub Maisonette 9 in Grand Theft Auto: The Ballad of Gay Tony was based on Bungalow 8. Sacco voiced Larissa Slalom, a radio guest and nightclub impresario heard on the in-game radio station WKTT.
