= Ardmore Residence =

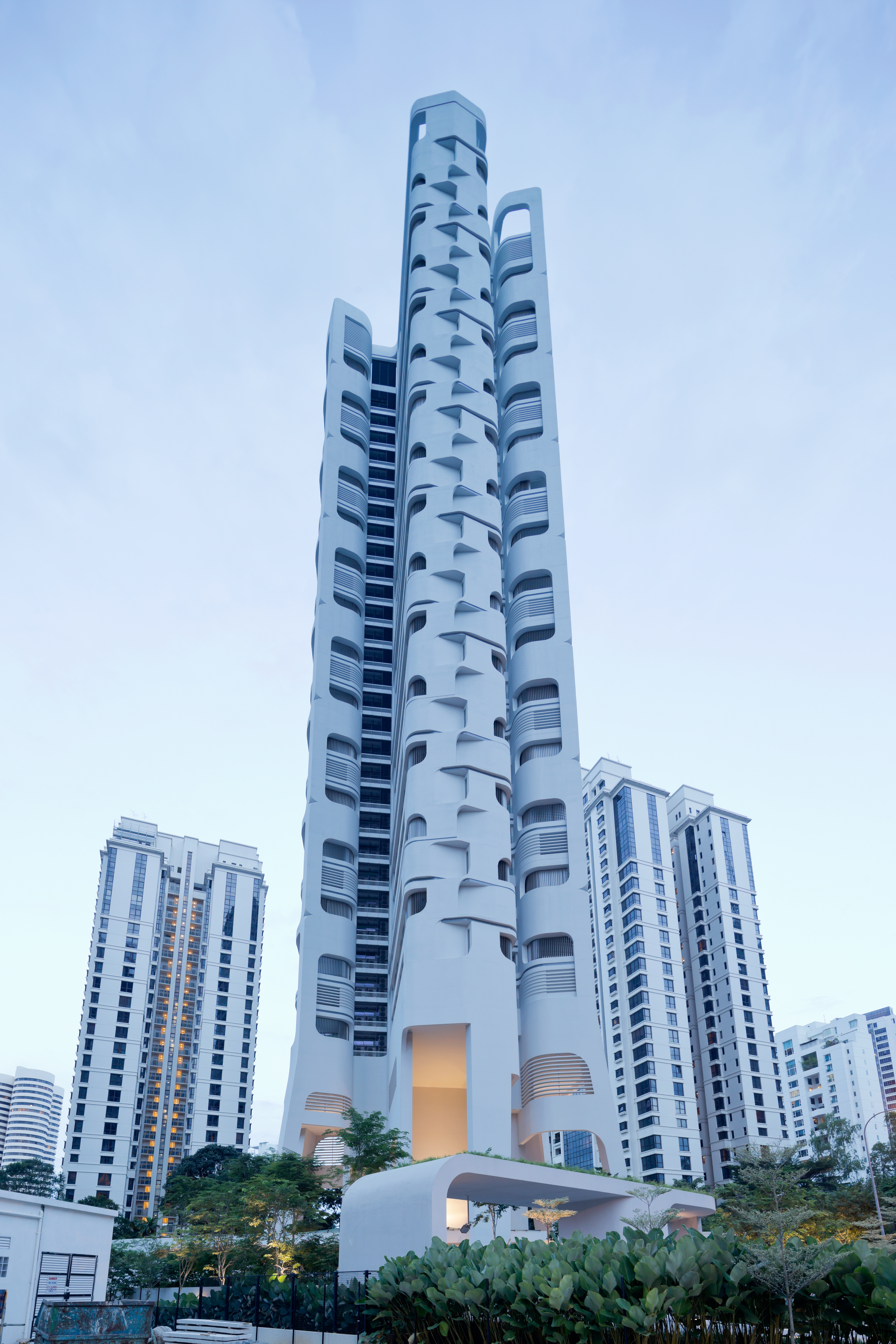
- Interactive map of the Ardmore Residence area

General information
- Status: Completed
- Type: Residential
- Location: 7 Ardmore Park, Singapore 259954, Singapore
- Coordinates: 1°18′35.9″N 103°49′44.0″E
- Construction started: 2009; 17 years ago
- Completed: 2013; 13 years ago

Height
- Height: 135.7 m

Technical details
- Floor count: 36

Design and construction
- Architect: Ben van Berkel
- Architecture firm: UNStudio

Other information
- Parking: Yes

Website
- ardmoreresidence.com

Ardmore Residence is a residential development in Singapore. The building, designed by UNStudio's architect Ben van Berkel, was completed in 2013. The tower’s skin is composed of four storey sections from which large openings and balconies are carved. The design has earned the building an Emporis Skyscraper Award and was listed by the organization as one of the top 10 skyscrapers in the world.

== Facilities and amenities ==
Facilities at Ardmore Residence include a gym, spa room, jacuzzi, sundecks, 50m swimming pool and cabanas shared amongst 58 units. The Residence has a clubhouse serviced by the Concierge from luxury hotel Capella Singapore and designed by Seattle-based interior designer Terry Hunziker, who specializes in high-end residential and commercial project

== Architecture and art ==
Ardmore Residence was designed by Ben Van Berkel of UNStudio, who conceptualizes the residence as a “living landscape” because of its “indoor-outdoor living experience”.

“My Pumpkin Exists in the Infinite” by Japanese contemporary artist Yayoi Kusama at Ardmore Residence is one of only two large pumpkin sculptures she has made. The artist expressed her joy in having her pumpkin alive at the residence as they can live with her “beautiful memory”.

== Locality ==
Ardmore Residence is within walking distance to Orchard Road. Overseas Family School and Chatsworth International School are located 1.1 and 1.4 km from the building, respectively.

== See also ==
- List of buildings and structures in Singapore
