= Oleg Volosovskiy =

Ukrainian architect

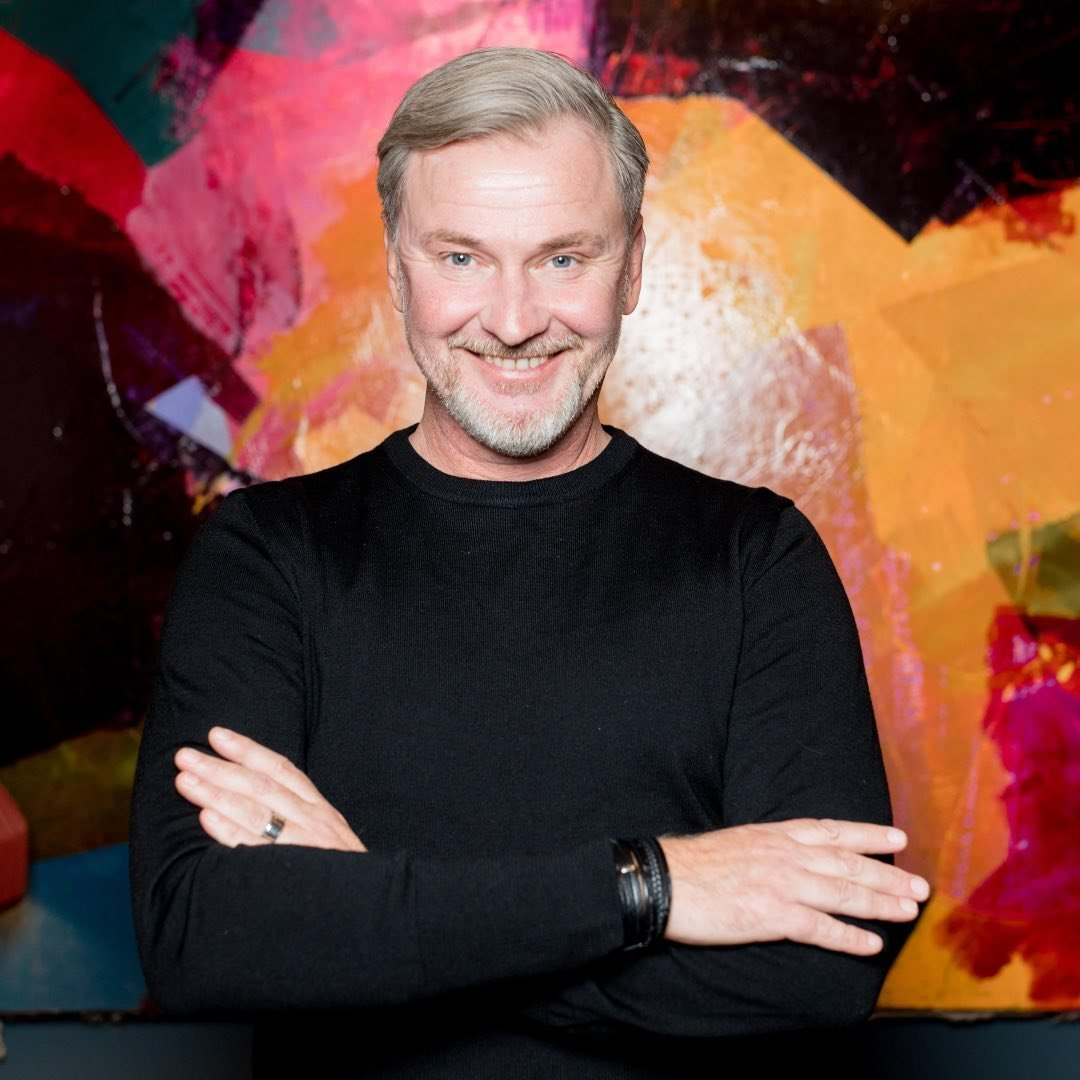
- Born: 26 January 1971 (age 55); Kyiv, Ukraine
- Education: National Academy of Visual Arts and Architecture
- Occupations: Architect, designer, scenographer, lecturer
- Website: Official Website

Oleg Volosovskiy (Ukrainian: Олег Вадимович Волосовський; born 26 January 1971) is a Ukrainian architect, designer, scenographer, and lecturer. He is the founder of loft buro.

== Early life ==
Oleg Volosovskiy was born in Kyiv, Ukraine on 26 January 1971. His father was originally an electronic engineer, and later he started working in jewelry. His grandfather was a lighting architect responsible for the gas-discharge illumination of Khreshchatyk Street in Kyiv.

In 1994, he graduated from the National Academy of Visual Arts and Architecture with a degree in Architectural Design.

While studying at the academy, he and his colleagues created their first small projects.

== Career ==
In 1995, Oleg Volosovskiy began his professional career in architecture and founded Studio 2111 in Kyiv. The projects were created using the facilities of his small production. The studio designs interiors for bars, shops, and entertainment centers.

Later, he added props and costumes for circus performers as a separate work area. An important stage was his work as a production designer at the Roman Viktyuk Theater. He decorated the stages of the National Palace of Arts "Ukraine" and the Taras Shevchenko National Academic Opera and Ballet Theater of Ukraine.

He designed the space for the Ukrainian television reality shows "On Knives", "Behind the Glass", and "Hell's Kitchen".

In 2001, the studio was reorganized and its name was changed. Oleg became the founder and chief architect of loft buro (Kyiv, Ukraine), a company specializing in interior design for public and private spaces in Ukraine and abroad.

The studio is known for working in the colonial loft style first used in their projects, exemplified by the Hayloft and East-West apartments, Enjoy the Silence chalet, Marokana, Chi, and Ugli restaurants.

In 2023, loft buro projects were included in the book UkraineRising (published by gestalten & Lucia Bondar), which presents the achievements of 70 Ukrainian creatives in various industries. The studio's works are published in international publications: Elle, ArchDaily, designboom, Projects are nominated for participation in international and national awards: Dezeen Awards, Frame Awards, SBID, Restaurant & Bar Design Awards.

After the full-scale invasion of Ukraine in 2022, the studio began working on social projects, including modular housing for IDPs and housing modules for home improvement.
