= Four (Frankfurt) =

Mixed-use skyscraper project in Frankfurt, Germany

FOUR
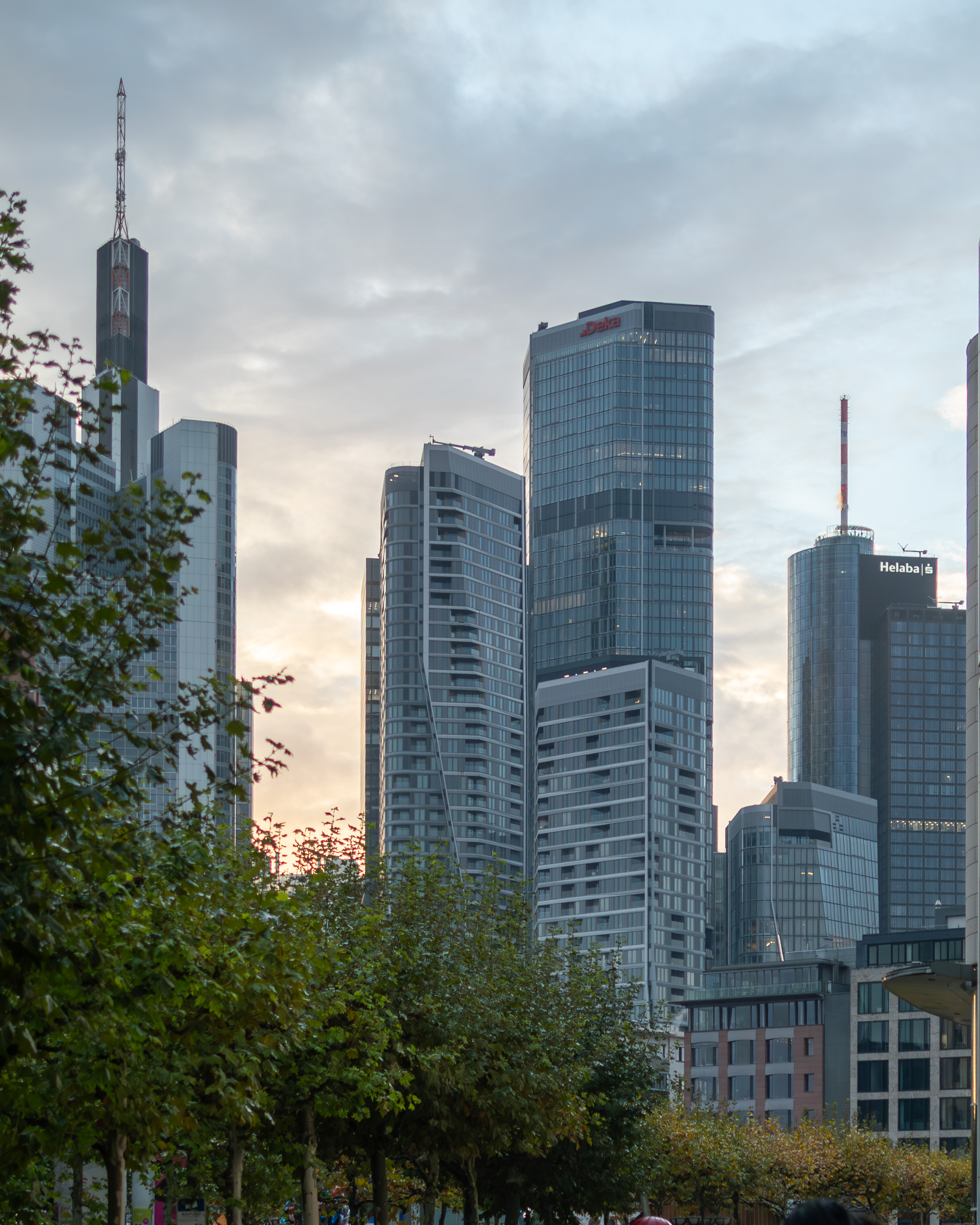
- The construction site of Four Frankfurt in November 2025

General information
- Status: Completed
- Type: Mixed-use
- Location: Frankfurt, Germany, 60315
- Coordinates: 50°06′43″N 8°40′25″E
- Construction started: 2018 (complex); 2021 (tallest tower)
- Estimated completion: 2025
- Opened: 2025

Height
- Height: Tower 1: 233 m (764 ft); Tower 2: 179 m (587 ft); Tower 3: 128 m (420 ft); Tower 4: 105 m (344 ft)

Technical details
- Floor count: Tower 1: 59; Tower 2: 50; Tower 3: 33; Tower 4: 25
- Lifts/elevators: 53

Design and construction
- Architect: Ben van Berkel
- Architecture firm: UNStudio
- Developer: Groß & Partner

Website
- 4frankfurt.de

Four, also known as Four Frankfurt, is a luxury mixed-use skyscraper complex in Frankfurt, consisting of four skyscrapers. It is located in the area known as the Deutsche Bank triangle in the Innenstadt borough. The tallest skyscraper is 233 metres (764 ft) high and has the highest usable floor in Frankfurt. By total building height it is both Frankfurt and Germany's third-tallest building upon its estimated completion in 2024. Dutch star-architect and student of Zaha Hadid, Ben van Berkel has designed and developed the building.

The area was formerly occupied by one of Frankfurt's first skyscrapers, Deutsche Bank Investment Banking Center Frankfurt (IBCF), completed in 1971 and demolished in 2018. The property was sold by Deutsche Bank to Groß & Partner in 2015. The ensemble will include office space for around 4,000 people and 600 residential apartments, as well as shops and restaurants, with a projected cost of around one billion euros.

== History ==
In 1999, Deutsche Bank invited 110 architects to a two-stage competition for the construction of a high-rise office tower. A jury chaired by architect Christoph Mäckler selected 25 participants for the second stage of the competition, which produced five winning designs in November 1999.

In February 2000, the design from the architecture firm Murphy/Jahn for a 228-meter-high tower was chosen as the final winner. The building consisted of 50 storeys and 120,000 m^{2} of floor space. The building would have been named "MAX", becoming the third tallest building in Frankfurt, after the Commerzbank Tower and Messeturm. After the terrorist attacks on September 11, 2001, the realization of the "MAX" high-rise was put in doubt. Deutsche Bank had apparently proposed the European Central Bank's project to build its new headquarters, but in 2002 the ECB decided to move to another location in Frankfurt's Ostend.

After the completion of the IBC in 2003, Deutsche Bank sold the building to the American financial investor Blackstone Group and only rented part of the building for the Deutsche Bank residential and business customer segment. The bank's dealers, for whom the building was originally intended, remained in the old location in the IBCF tower.

At the end of 2013, Deutsche Bank announced that it would leave the area in the banking district it was using by 2017. The rationale for this relocation was the poor structural condition of the IBCF high-rise; The high-rise, completed in 1971, was one of the oldest in Frankfurt. It was the headquarters of Deutsche Bank until the construction of the twin towers on the Taunus system in 1984. From 2014, Deutsche Bank held talks with the city of Frankfurt and potential investors for a new development in the area. In November 2015, it was announced that the 16,159 m^{2} area would be sold to Groß & Partner. The parties have agreed not to disclose the purchase price.

A design competition was held in March 2016 for the development of the site. The competition was won by architectural firm UNStudio, who produced the final design.

== Design ==
The complex consists of four high-rise buildings, measuring a height of 233, 179, 128 and 104 metres respectively. The four towers are connected at the base by a multi-story plinth. The buildings are oriented to allow higher sunlight penetration. Alongside the buildings, publicly accessible spaces will be provided, such as a planned roof garden, a city square, and multiple restaurants and retail outlets.

The building was designed by the Dutch architectural firm UNStudio and their consortium partners HPP Architects.

== Usage ==
Four is a mixed-use development. The complex will include office space for around 4,000 people, 600 residential units (both rental and owner-occupied), subsidized housing, retail space, restaurants, and two luxury hotels: a Kimpton and a Radisson Collection hotel. The first and fourth tallest buildings will comprise primarily office space, with a large part of the office space rented to Germany-based asset management DekaBank, the global consulting firm the Boston Consulting Group, and US law firm Baker McKenzie, while the second and third buildings will be primarily residential. The top floors are large penthouse apartments ranging up to a 1000 sqm. and selling for up to 20 million Euros.

== Gallery (Construction progress) ==
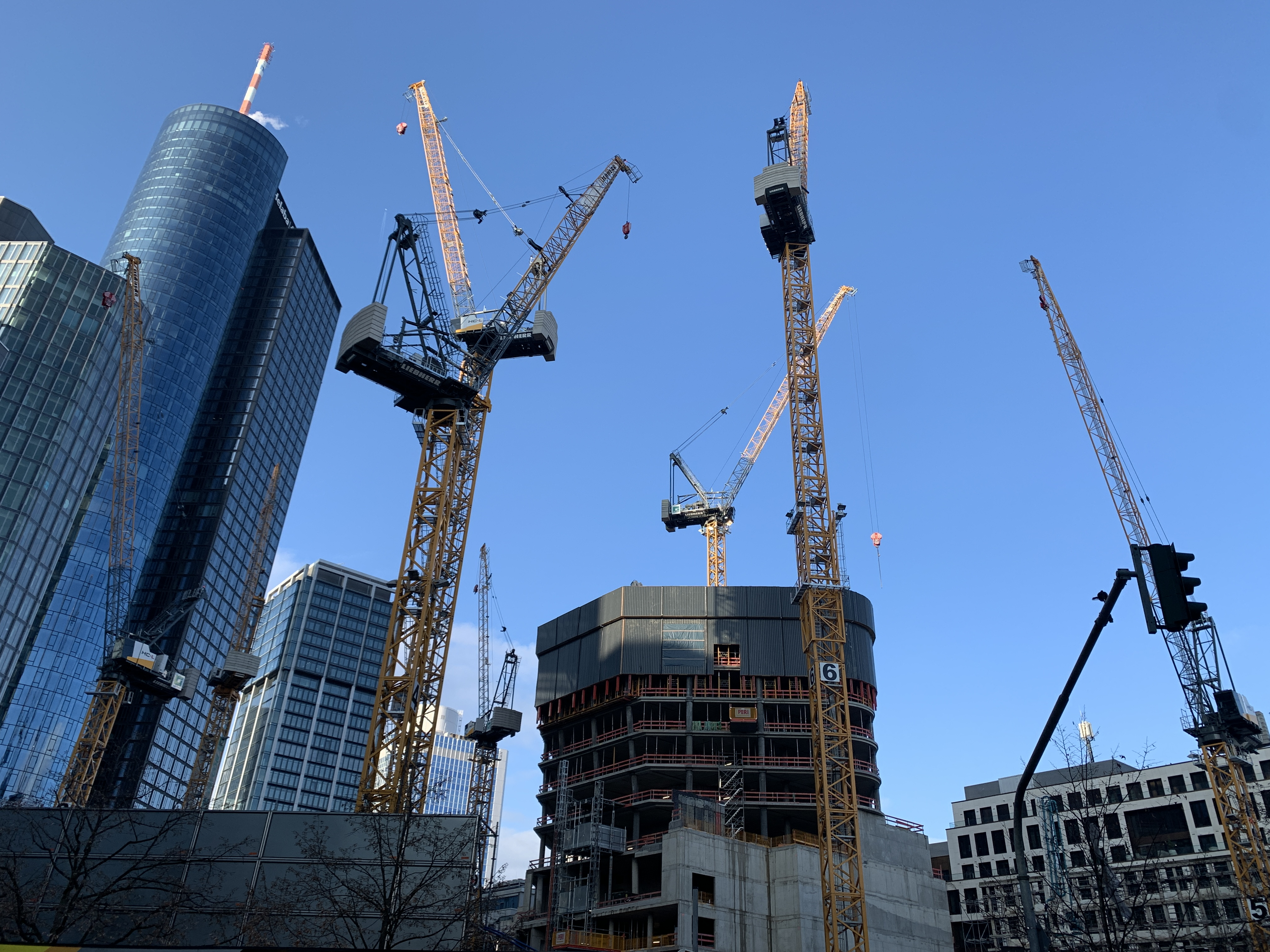
Progress, December 2021

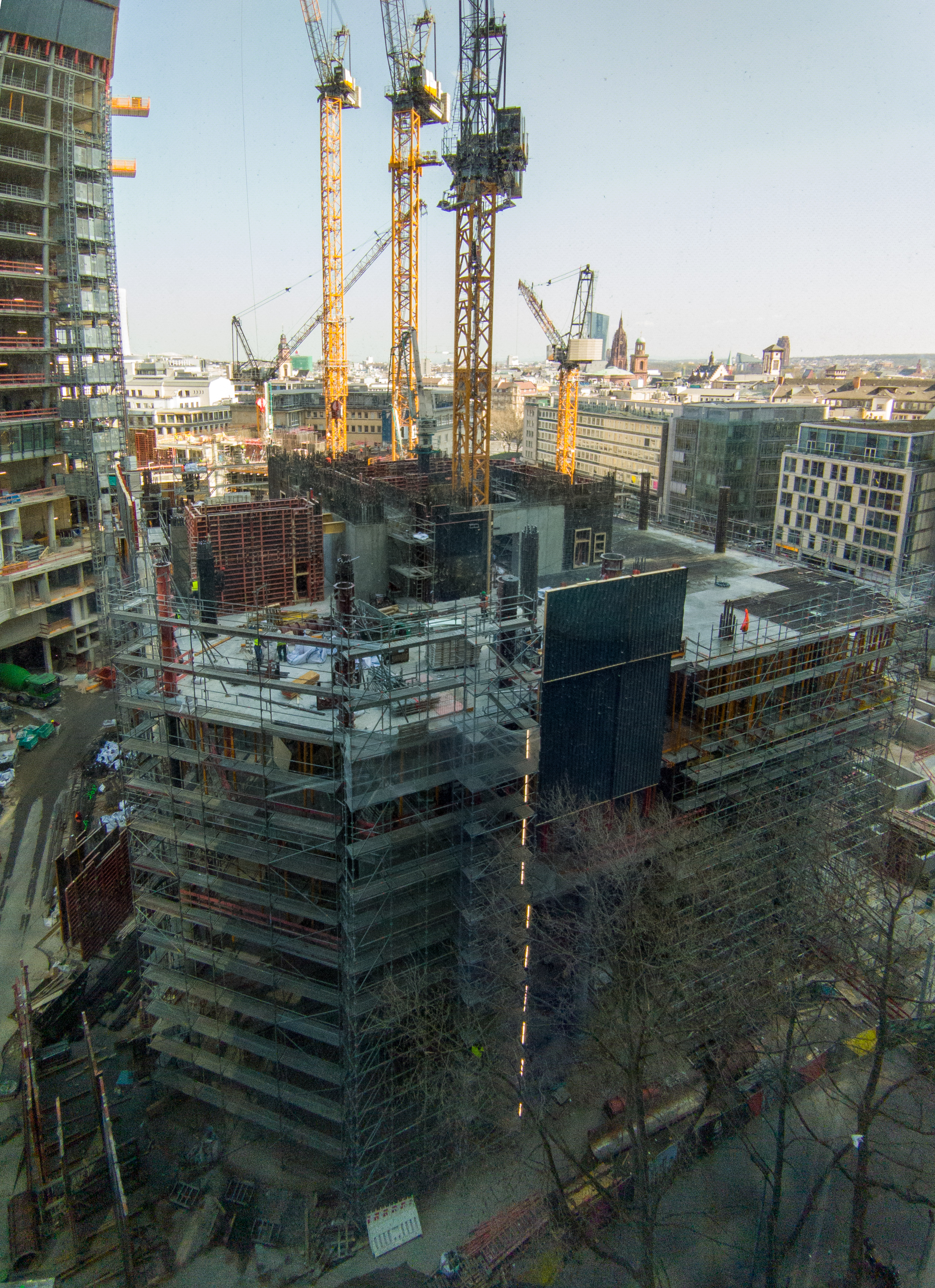
Progress, March 2022

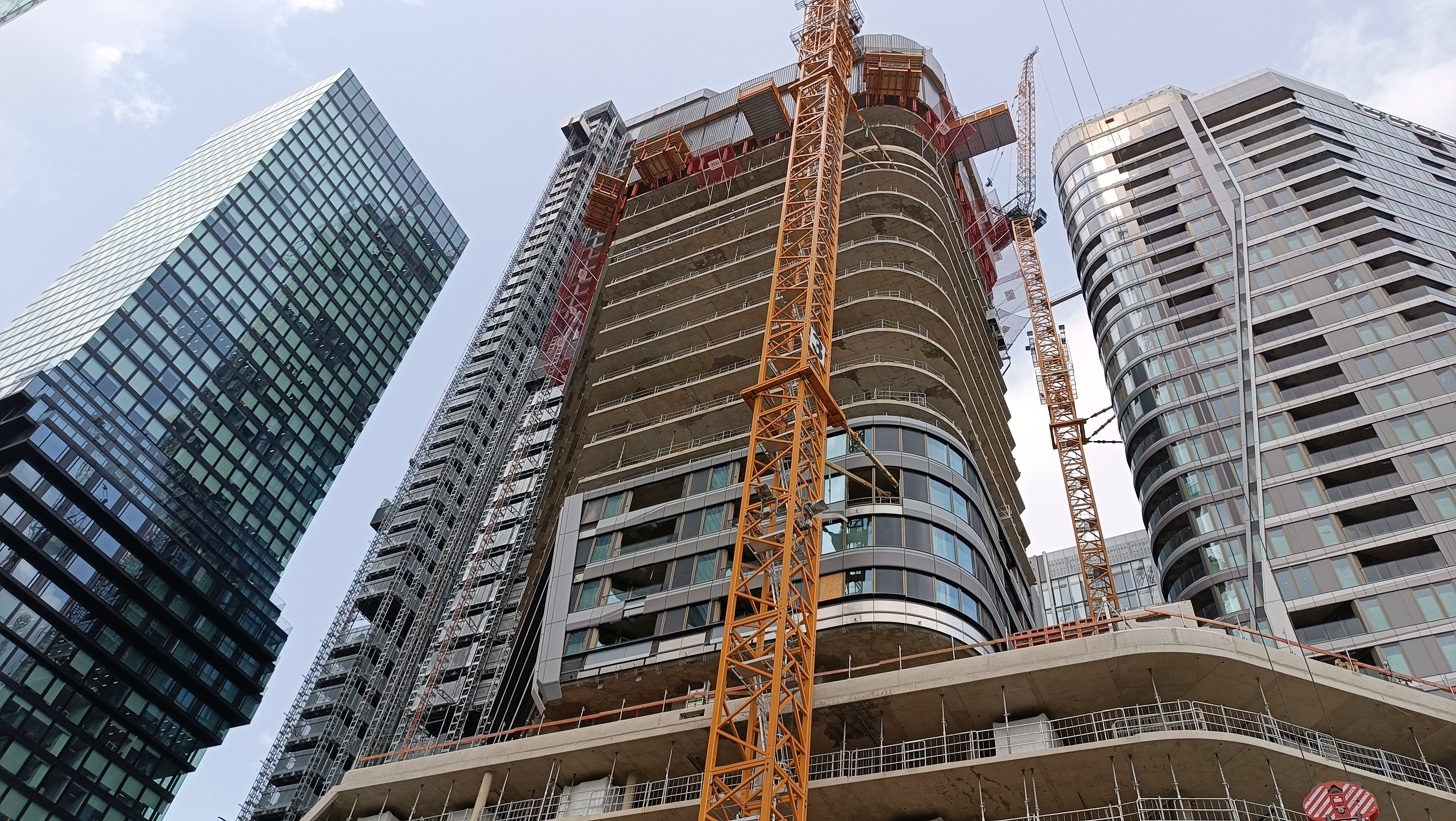
Progress, July 2023

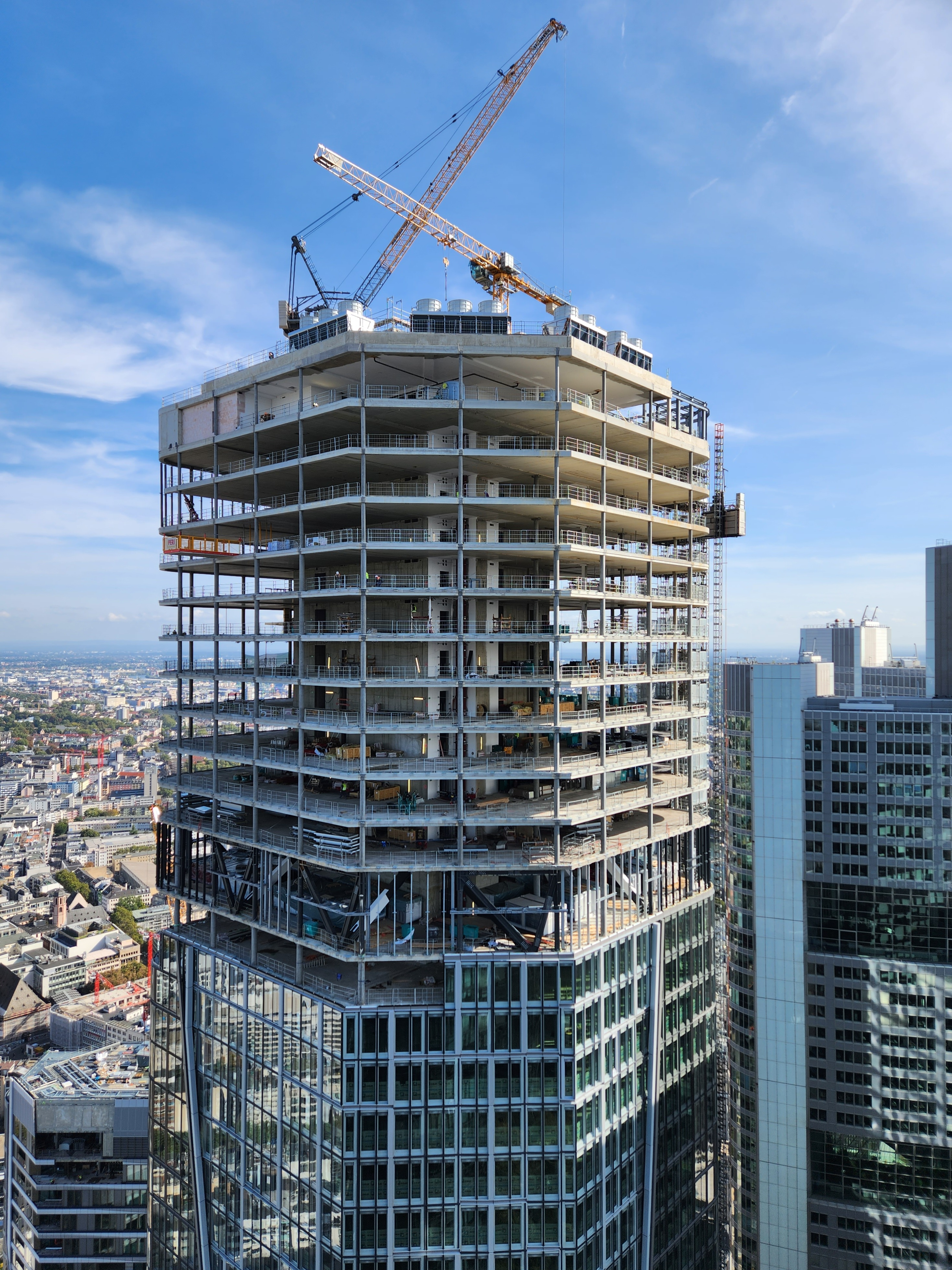
Progress F1, October 2023

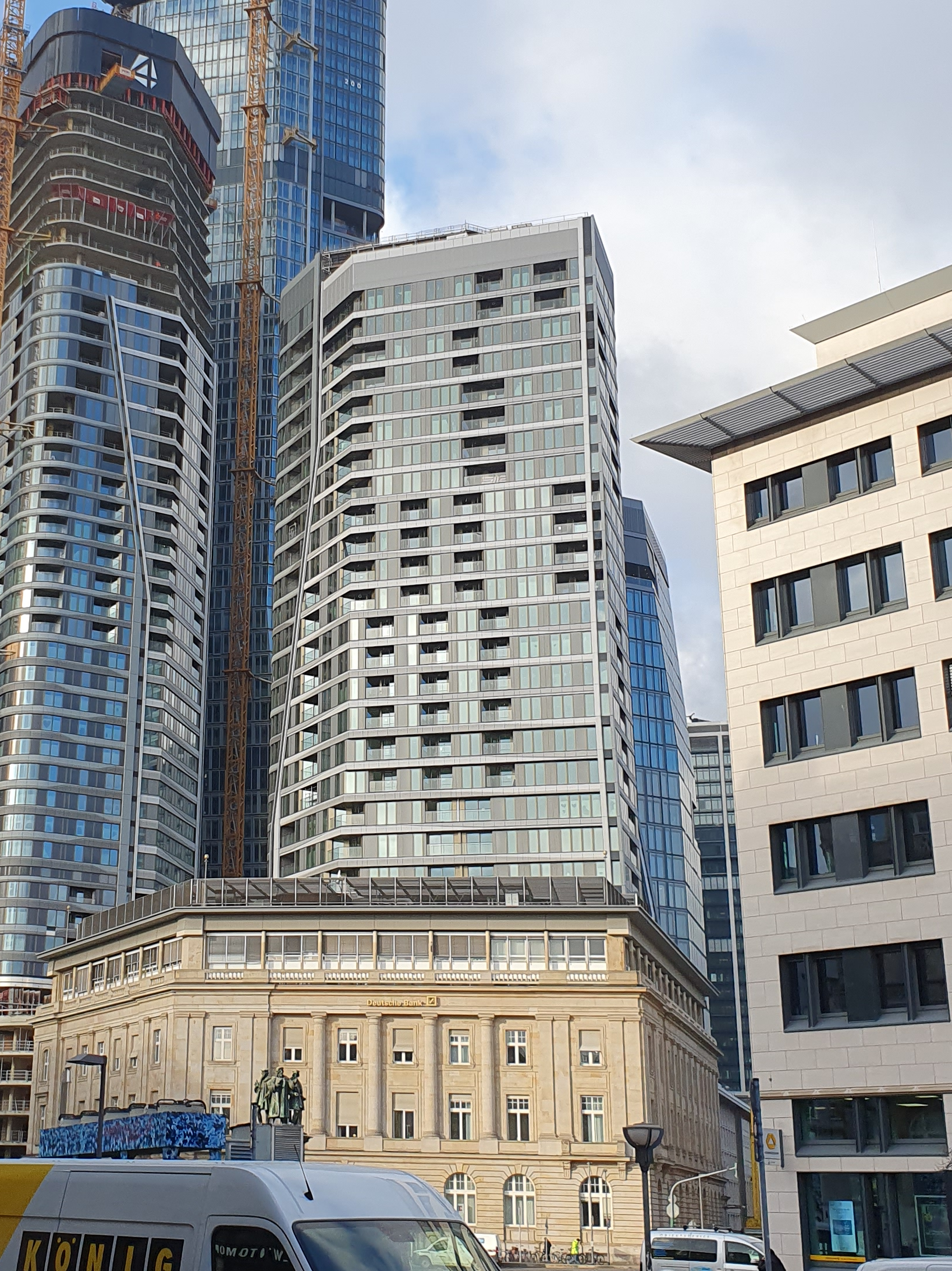
Four 3, February 2024

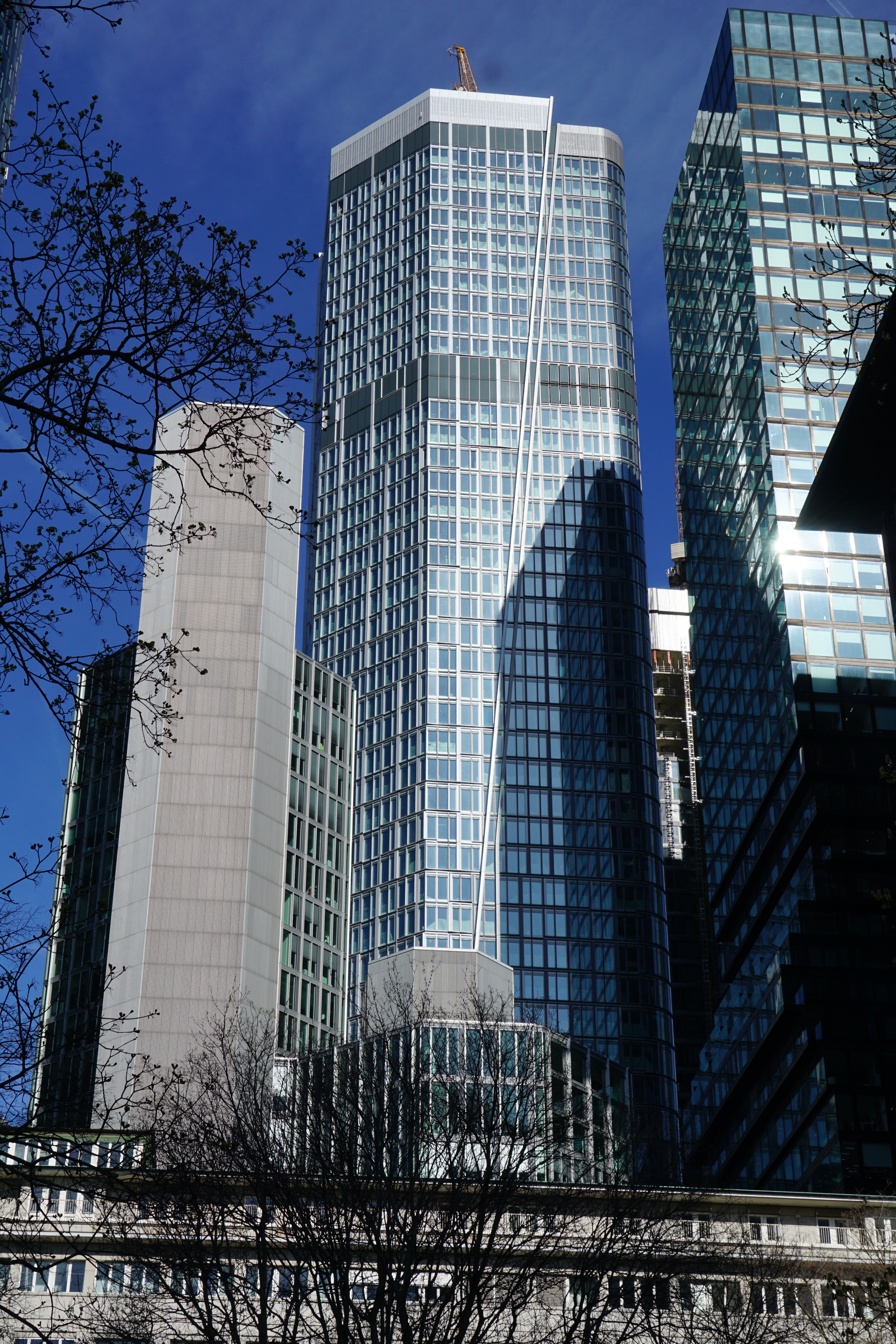
Four 1, March 2024

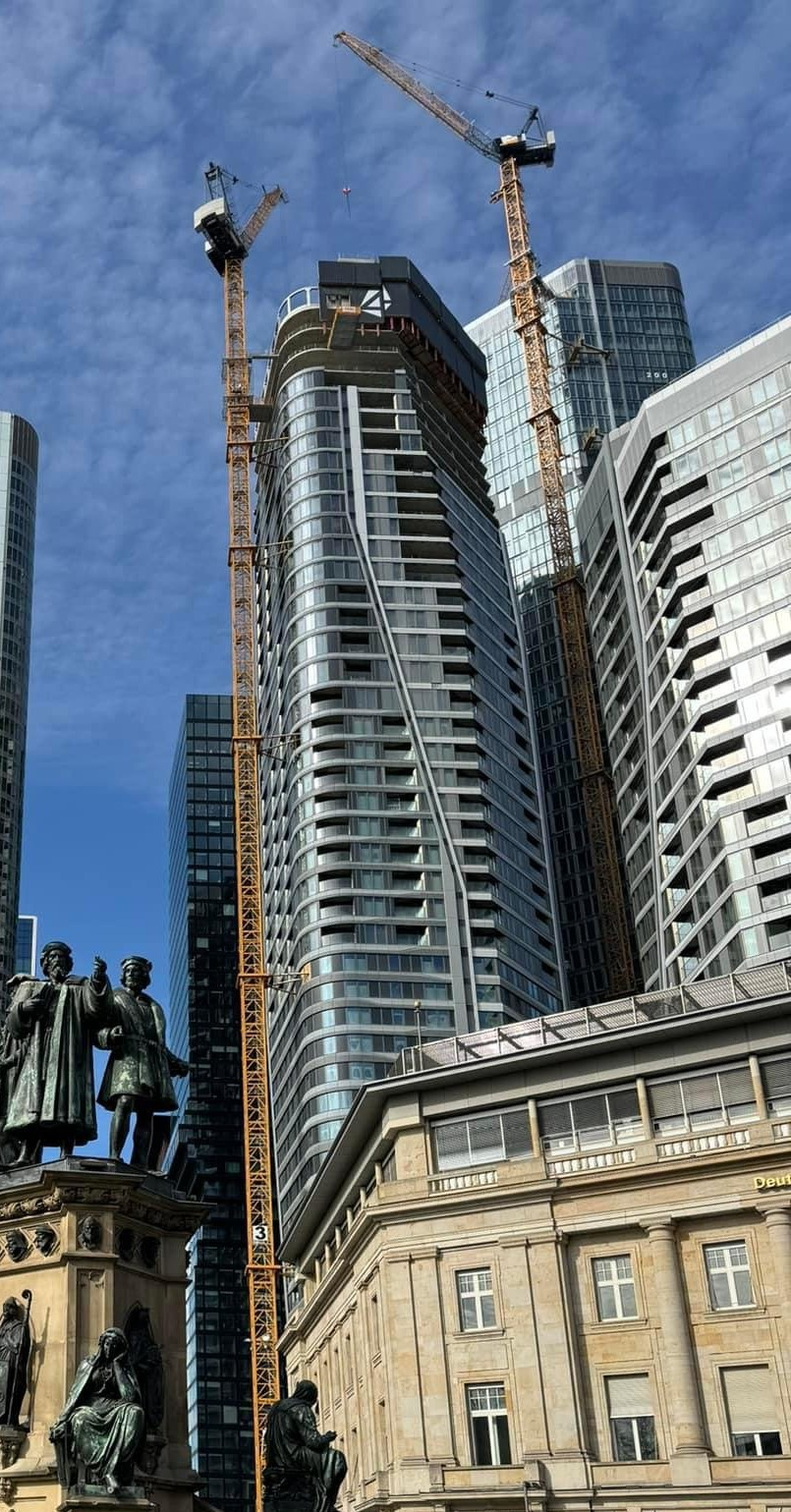
Progress, April 2024

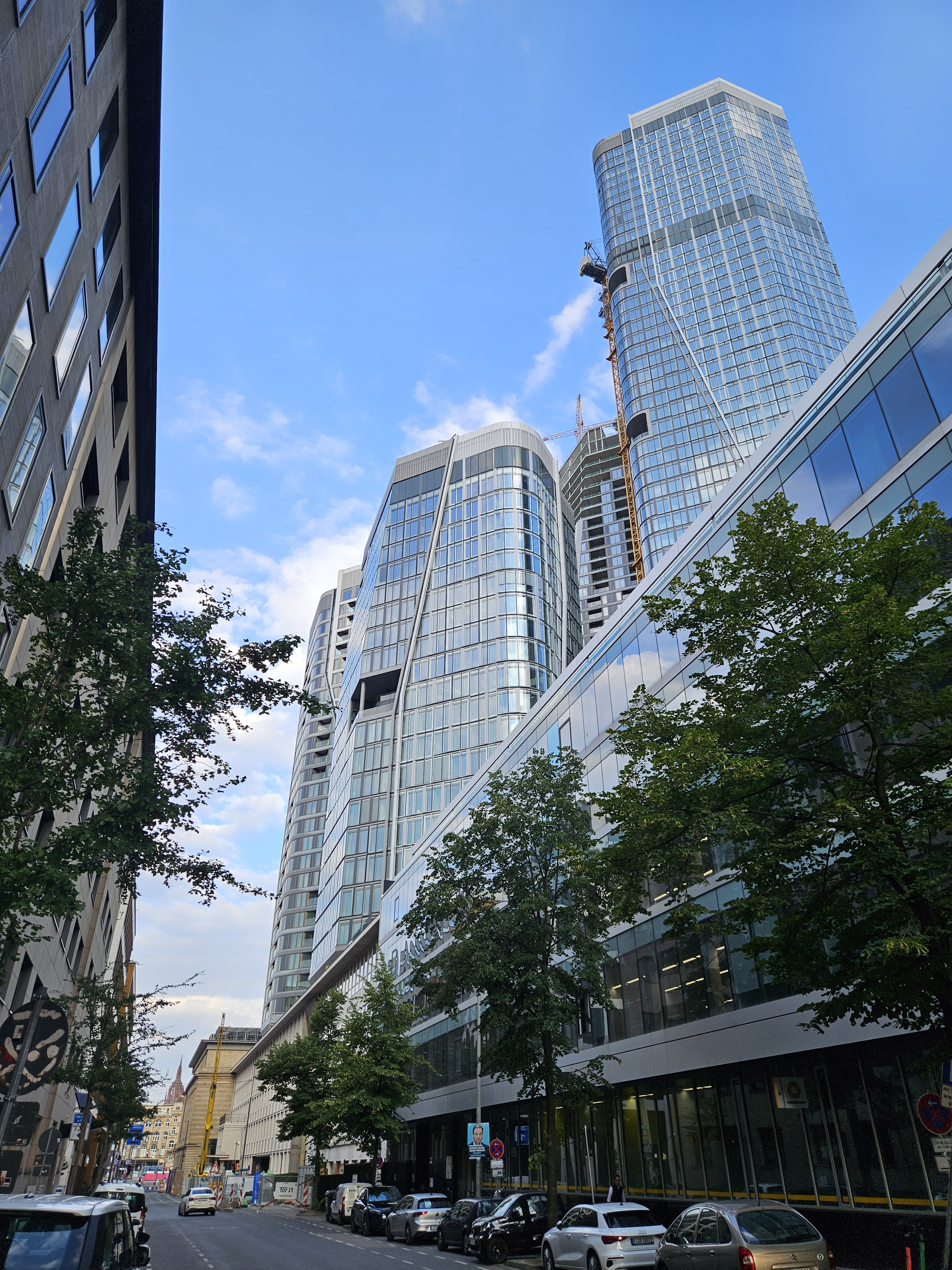
Four 4, June 2024
