= List of tallest structures in Armenia =

This is a list of Armenia's tallest structures, containing all types of structures.

== Tallest structures ==
Name	Picture	Pinnacle height	Year	Construction type	Town	Province	Coordinates	Remarks
Yerevan TV Tower		311.7 metres (1,023 ft)	1977	lattice tower	Yerevan	Yerevan	40°10′16.64″N 44°32′10.77″E	the tallest structure in the Caucasus, the fourth-tallest tower in Western Asia, the sixth-tallest free-standing lattice tower and thirty-eighth-tallest tower in the world.
Dalan Technologies		110 metres (360 ft)	2027	Building	Yerevan	Yerevan	40°18′02.15"N 44°48′39.90E	The tallest building in Armenia
Elite Plaza Business Center		85 metres (279 ft)	2013	Building	Yerevan	Yerevan	40°10′30.5″N 44°30′36.4″E	the former tallest building in Armenia.
Cinema House		83 metres (272 ft)	2010	Building	Yerevan	Yerevan	40°10′33.7″N 44°31′10.0″E	
Teryan 5		82 metres (269 ft)	2021	Building	Yerevan	Yerevan	40°10′55.2″N 44°30′47.2″E	
Dalma Garden Apartments		82 metres (269 ft)	2012	Building	Yerevan	Yerevan	40°10′43.7″N 44°29′22.1″E	
Avnik		82 metres (269 ft)	2010	Building	Yerevan	Yerevan	40°11′58.9″N 44°29′11.3″E	
Sayat-Nova 19		75 metres (246 ft)	2016	Building	Yerevan	Yerevan	40°10′58.9″N 44°31′12.1″E	
Pushkin 25		74 metres (243 ft)	2019	Building	Yerevan	Yerevan	40°10′55.9″N 44°30′45.9″E	
Sasna Tsrer 2		74 metres (243 ft)	2013	Building	Yerevan	Yerevan	40°12′51.3″N 44°29′26.8″E	
Nersisyan Towers		71 metres (233 ft)	2021	Building	Yerevan	Yerevan	40°12′21.5″N 44°31′52.1″E	
Mamikonyants 41		71 metres (233 ft)	2010	Building	Yerevan	Yerevan	40°12′34.1″N 44°30′37.9″E	
Pavstos Buzand 97		67 metres (220 ft)	2018	Building	Yerevan	Yerevan	40°10′59.4″N 44°30′22.9″E	
Davtashen Residential Complex		67 metres (220 ft)	2020	Building	Yerevan	Yerevan	40°13′08.6″N 44°30′03.8″E	
Moldovakan 27		67 metres (220 ft)		Building	Yerevan	Yerevan	40°12′23.1″N 44°34′13.2″E	
Amiryan 27		67 metres (220 ft)		Building	Yerevan	Yerevan	40°10′55.3″N 44°30′20.4″E	
Yeznik Koghbatsi 16		63 metres (207 ft)	2020	Building	Yerevan	Yerevan	40°10′49.0″N 44°30′35.4″E	
Multi City House		63 metres (207 ft)	2018	Building	Yerevan	Yerevan	40°11′35.4″N 44°32′25.8″E	
Rostom 29		61 metres (200 ft)		Building	Yerevan	Yerevan	40°10′02.5″N 44°31′05.9″E	
Baghramyan 59		60 metres (200 ft)	2015	Building	Yerevan	Yerevan	40°11′37.7″N 44°29′49.4″E	
St Gregory the Illuminator Cathedral		60 metres (200 ft)	2001	church	Yerevan	Yerevan	40°10′19″N 44°31′01″E	
Mother Armenia		51 metres (167 ft)	1967	statue	Yerevan	Yerevan	40°11′41.9″N 44°31′28.8″E	

== Tallest destroyed ==
Name	Image	Height	Year built	Year demolished	Structure type	City	Province	Notes
Yerevan Youth Palace		63 metres (207 ft)	1974	2006	Building	Yerevan	Yerevan	Tallest building in Armenia from 1974 until its demolition in 2006. Tallest building in Caucasus region until 1998.

== Tallest proposed ==
Name	Height	Floors	Year proposed	Construction type	City	Province	Notes
Forget-Me-Not Complex	270 metres (890 ft)	71	2019	Building	Yerevan	Yerevan	
Persia Tower	126 metres (413 ft)	38	2011	Building	Yerevan	Yerevan	

== See also ==
- List of tallest structures by country
