= Caroline Bos =

Dutch architect

- Born: 1959 (age 66–67); Rotterdam, Netherlands
- Occupation: Architect
- Practice: UNStudio
- Buildings: Mercedes-Benz Museum

Caroline Bos (born 1959, Rotterdam) is a Dutch architect. She is a co-founder of UNStudio, a large award-winning architecture firm in Amsterdam. Bos writes, lectures and teaches architecture at various schools. Her architectural drawings and models are shown at museums like MoMA.

== Education ==
Bos received a bachelor of arts in art history from Birkbeck, University of London in 1991. She later obtained a master's degree in architecture at Utrecht University in the Netherlands. It was in London that she first met Ben van Berkel.

== Work ==
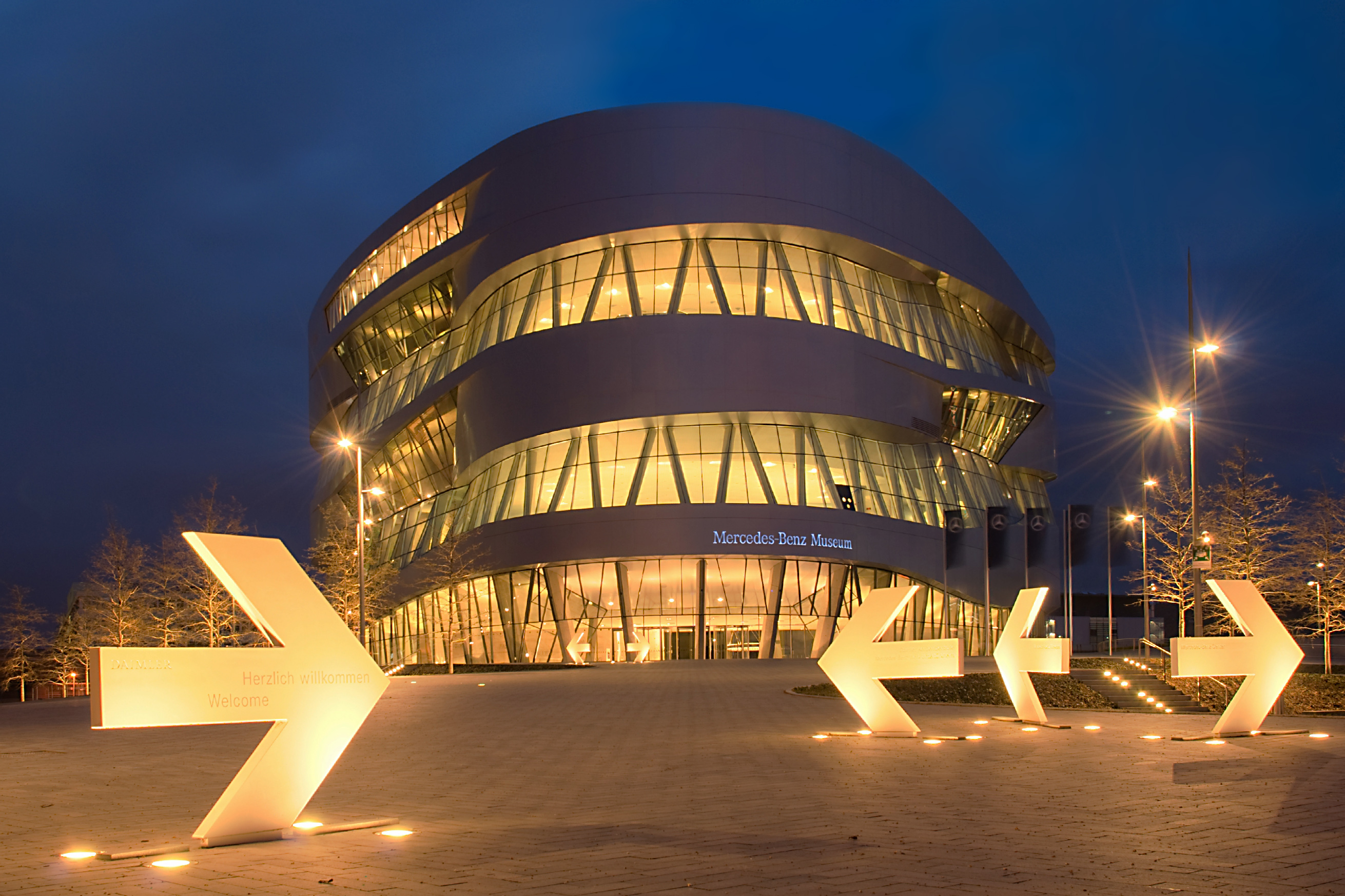
Mercedes-Benz Museum at night

Bos first worked as a journalist with Ben van Berkel on publications such as Forum (1985–86) and "Diagram Works" (1988).

Bos and van Berkel, founded Berkel & Bos Architectuurbureau in Amsterdam in 1988. The firm designed several "critically acclaimed projects" in the Netherlands.

In 1998, the name of the firm was changed to UNStudio. The decision to remove their own names from their company is very in keeping with Bos' attitude that architecture is about collaboration. UNStudio has been "at the forefront of knowledge-driven architectural practice. The firm consists of a network of experts in architecture, urban development and infrastructure. Bos works closely with the entire team on a project and ensures that they are working towards good ideas. UNStudio promotes collaboration in order to undertake ambitious building projects. This approach they call "deep planning" which takes the neighborhood and surrounding areas into consideration when planning the location of a new building. UNStudio and Bos' and van Berkel's approach is "against the old idea of the master builder scribbling away on his drawings. If you've built one building, you know you are only a bit player in the whole process." Bos has been called UNStudio's "secret weapon" because she was not trained as a designer and has an outsider's approach to architecture. She has also been called "one of the best architects in the office."

As of March 2012, the firm has a staff of 153 from 17 countries and has completed 69 projects. Bos has been involved in all of these, working with the various project teams. In the early years, Bos shares that much of their work came through architectural competitions because it was a good way for "independent and non-corporate practices to acquire a body of work." Some of the major urban infrastructure that Bos worked on include the Prince Claus Bridge in Utrecht, the Netherlands and the Mercedes-Benz Museum in Stuttgart, Germany.

Bos has taught at various institutions including the Academy of Architecture in Arnhem, Liverpool University, the Vienna University of Technology and the Berlage Institute in Amsterdam. Together with Ben van Berkel, she has also been a visiting lecturer at Princeton University and has co-authored several UNStudio publications. In 2012, she received an Honorary Professorship from the University of Melbourne.

Bos likes to test preconceived notions about traditional architecture. Early in her career, she likened architecture it to high fashion: "the architect will be concerned with dressing the future." Bos also cites the importance of fitting infrastructure into urban surroundings efficiently and taking into account diverse users of the work. As her work progressed over time she has said that urban planning isn't utilized anymore and instead have "architecture and politics." She says of her work with van Berkel, "Alongside pursuing theoretical works, we sought from the beginning to build."

== Influences ==
Bos maintains that she has been particularly inspired by Renaissance and Baroque architects, such as Filippo Brunelleschi and Gian Lorenzo Bernini, as well as by the 20th-century Dutch architect, Aldo van Eyck.
