= Yerevan TV Tower =

- Yerevan TV Tower, viewed from above
- Interactive map of the Yerevan TV Tower area

General information
- Type: TV and Radio broadcast
- Location: Yerevan, Armenia
- Coordinates: 40°10′16.64″N 44°32′10.77″E
- Completed: 1977

Height
- Roof: 311.7 m (1,023 ft)

Yerevan TV Tower (Armenian: Երևանի հեռուստաաշտարակ, Yerevani herustaashtarak) is a 311.7-metre (1,023 ft) high lattice tower built in 1977 on Nork Hill near downtown Yerevan, Armenia. It is the tallest structure in Armenia, fourth-tallest tower in Western Asia (The Milad Tower in Tehran being the tallest), sixth-tallest free-standing lattice tower and thirty-eighth-tallest tower in the world.

== Construction ==
In the late 1960s it was decided to replace the 180-metre (590 ft)-high TV tower in Yerevan due to the insufficient capacity of the latter.

The preparatory work on Yerevan TV tower and Tbilisi Tower, which also needed replacement, started simultaneously at the Ukrainian Institute for Steel Structures. The project leaders were Isaak Zatulovsky, Anatoli Perelmuter, Mark Grinberg, Yuri Shevernitsky, and Boris But. Tbilisi and Yerevan were the first among the Soviet capitals where towers were built. The same group later worked on the project of Kyiv TV Tower (though it was finished earlier than in Yerevan). Tbilisi Tower is lower, lighter and slightly tilted compared to Yerevan Tower.

Construction started in 1974 and finished 3 years later. The steel was shipped from Rustavi Metallurgical Plant in Georgia.

The old tower was moved to Leninakan, current Gyumri, where it is still functional today.

== Structure ==
The structure of the TV tower in Yerevan is virtually divided into three parts: base, body, and antenna.

The base is a truss-steel tetrahedron that at the height of 71 metres becomes a closed-platform observation deck and technical offices. On the roof of this lower-tower basket are radio antennas. The triangular truss-steel structure continues to the height of 137 metres where a two-storey 18-metre structure in the shape of an inverted-truncated cone is situated. The lattice grid structure continues another 30 meters.

In the centre of this structure there is a concrete vertical pipe structure with a diameter of 4.2 metres, in which, among other things, the lift-shaft is hidden. The pipe projecting from the basement continues as an antenna carrier. This form was widespread in the Soviet Union with steel towers. For example, the Kyiv TV Tower and the Saint Petersburg TV Tower follow this construction principle.

The antenna carrier tapers (diameter per section: 4 meters, 3 meters, 2.6 meters, 1.72 meters and 0.75 meters) between five maintenance bridges to the top. The entire steel structure is painted white and international orange to comply with air safety regulations (similar to the Tokyo Tower and the Tbilisi TV Tower).

The weight of the structure is 1900 tonnes and the basement is 1170 metres above the sea level.

In 2026, the tower received a new architectural lighting design that transformed it into a dynamic media installation. Developed by Ukrainian lighting designer Mykola Kabluka and Expolight, the system uses programmable luminaires, individually addressable light pixels, and laser elements to generate changing visual scenarios based on real-time urban data and public interaction. The lighting system also supports themed programmes for public events and holidays.

== Broadcasting history ==
Installation of the tower in 1977 allowed to receive a wide variety of programs from the Moscow Central television, as well as from other Soviet Union republics. In those years the average daily length of programs broadcast by Armenian television reached twelve hours, of which two-and-a-half hours in color, including four hours and thirty-five minutes of their own programming. Ninety-six percent of the population watched the first program. In 1978 it became possible to also receive the fourth channel of the Central television in Armenia In 1978 the programs watched were news (25%), music (23%), educational (13%), pre-adult entertainment (14.5%), political (9%) and military (6%), sport (4%), movies (3.5%) and others.

By 1978, the number of TV sets reached 500 000, of which 100 000 were color. Armenian SSR was the second in the Soviet Union with the popularization of TV. The length of TV programs per day reached 19 hours. About 50% of the programs were in color and 70% were recorded. In the subsequent years Armenia became the first of the republics of the Soviet Union by the percentage of the TV audience and the volume of programs.

== See also ==
- Lattice tower
- List of tallest towers in the world
- List of tallest freestanding structures in the world
- List of tallest freestanding steel structures
