= Mykola Kabluka =

Ukrainian artist (born 1978)

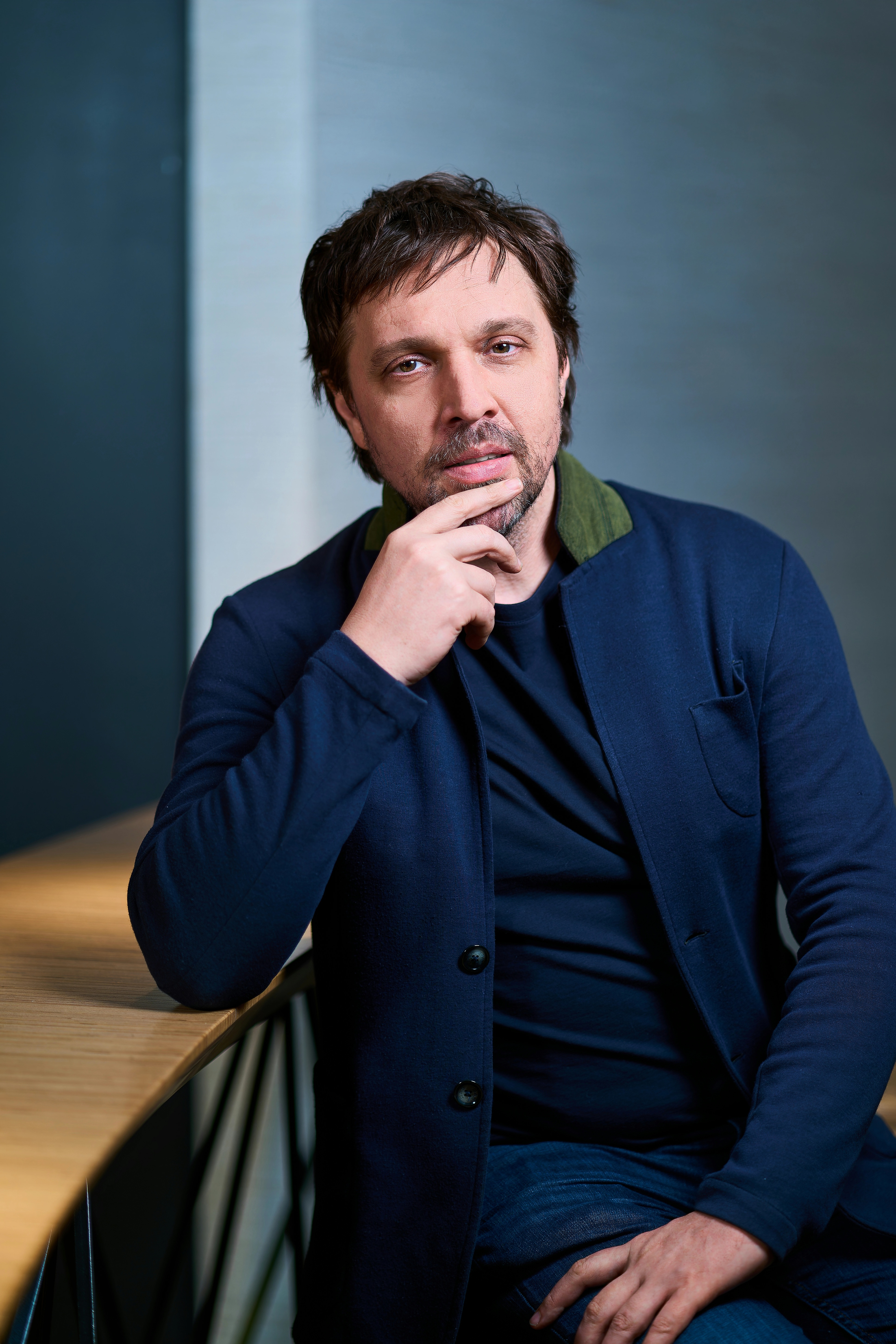
- Born: April 8, 1978 (age 48); Dnipro, Ukrainian SSR, Soviet Union
- Citizenship: Ukraine
- Education: Hochschule Wismar
- Occupations: artist, lighting designer
- Years active: 2000–present
- Organization: Expolight

Mykola Volodymyrovych Kabluka (born 8 April 1978 in Dnipro) is a Ukrainian artist and lighting designer. He is the founder and art director of the lighting design studio Expolight. Kabluka works in architectural lighting, media art, light installations, and urban lighting design. His practice combines artistic approaches with technological systems, optics, sound, and spatial design.

== Biography ==
Mykola Kabluka was born on 8 April 1978 in Dnipro. He studied applied mathematics before pursuing a career in lighting design.

In 2000, Kabluka founded Expolight, a lighting design studio working in architectural and landscape lighting, media façades, and art installations. The studio has completed more than 1,500 projects in Ukraine and abroad and develops its own software, optical systems, and custom equipment.

Kabluka holds a Master of Arts in Lighting Design from Hochschule Wismar in Germany. He is a member of international professional organizations, including the International Association of Lighting Designers (IALD) and the Illuminating Engineering Society (IES). In his professional work, he has collaborated with international architectural firms including Zaha Hadid Architects, UNStudio, and Avro|Ko.

Kabluka's works have been presented at international festivals and events, including Paris Design Week, where Pulse of Life was exhibited; Zurich Design Weeks, where the installation Soul was presented; and Burning Man 2025, where The Point of Unity was presented. He also takes part in professional forums, competitions, and events devoted to lighting design and urban lighting strategies.

== Selected works and projects ==
=== The Point of Unity ===
In 2025, Kabluka's work The Point of Unity was presented at the Burning Man festival in the Black Rock Desert, Nevada, United States. The installation used optical elements, reflective systems, adaptive lighting controls, and an autonomous power system to create an immersive visual environment. The work was also used as a site for marriage ceremonies involving 36 festival couples. It was included in selections of notable Burning Man 2025 installations by ArchDaily and Dezeen.

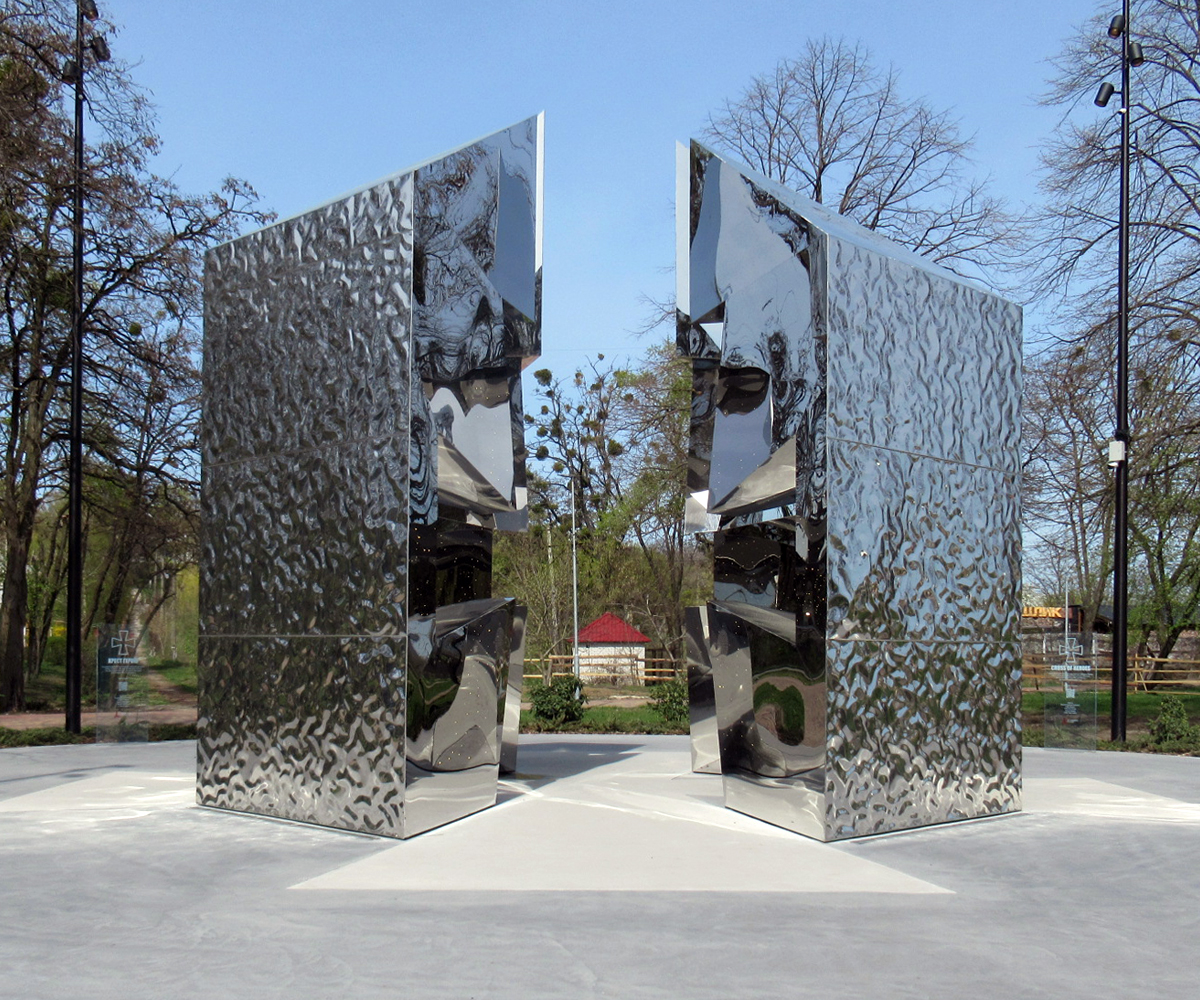
Cross of Heroes by Mykola Kabluka

=== Cross of Heroes Memorial Complex ===
The Cross of Heroes is a memorial project by Mykola Kabluka in Vyshhorod, Kyiv Oblast. Dedicated to fallen Ukrainian defenders, the project is based on the image of a Cossack cross. It combines lighting elements, translucent materials, an interior space for visitors, and the integration of light and sound. The memorial was designed as a space for individual reflection and interaction with the memorial environment.

=== Soul ===
Soul is a light installation by Expolight under the direction of Kabluka, presented in several cities. In Dnipro, it was shown on the façade of the Dnipro Art Museum for the museum's 110th anniversary. In Kyiv, it was presented on the façade of St. Nicholas Roman Catholic Church during Kyiv Design Week. The project was also shown in Zurich as part of Zurich Design Weeks. The installation was part of a cultural exchange between Kyiv Design Week and Zurich Design Weeks. In Zurich, it was presented at Bahnhof Enge, where its dynamic projections highlighted the architectural character of the historic station building. In Kyiv, the installation drew attention to the historical and cultural significance of St. Nicholas Church and the need for its continued restoration.

=== Dnipro Light Flowers ===
Dnipro Light Flowers is a post-industrial light art installation in Dnipro, created in 2020–2021. The project uses five industrial chimneys along the Dnipro River as the basis for a synchronized laser and lighting system. The installation incorporates lasers, pixel-based light sources, wireless synchronization, GPS controllers, and a custom lighting control system. According to the project description, webcams captured the colours of the evening sky and transmitted the data to a server controlling the lighting, allowing the chimneys to reproduce the sunset palette of that day. Its light effects are visible from different parts of the city, including the opposite bank of the river. The project has been interpreted as a symbolic transformation of Dnipro's industrial landscape. In 2021, Dnipro Light Flowers received a LIT Lighting Design Award in the light art project category.

=== Light show on Khortytsia Island ===
Mykola Kabluka designed a light show on Khortytsia Island in Zaporizhzhia as part of cultural and artistic events related to the history of the Cossacks and Ukrainian statehood. The project combined long-range laser systems, video projections onto natural landforms and the water surface, lighting, music, and the landscape of the Khortytsia National Reserve.

=== Freedom Square in Mariupol ===
The lighting and multimedia design for Freedom Square in Mariupol was developed under the artistic direction of Mykola Kabluka as part of the square's reconstruction. The project combined architectural and dynamic lighting, laser shows, video graphics, and digital infrastructure for lighting scenarios and public events. One of its visual elements was a series of bird-shaped installations symbolizing the 24 oblasts of Ukraine and the Autonomous Republic of Crimea. In 2021, the project received an IES Illumination Award for Outdoor Lighting Design.

=== Architectural and urban works ===
Kabluka's architectural and urban lighting projects include lighting concepts for Taryan Towers in Kyiv, UNIT.City, Saga City Space, and other sites. He has also participated in the development of urban lighting strategies for Ukrainian cities in collaboration with international lighting specialists, including French lighting designer Roger Narboni.

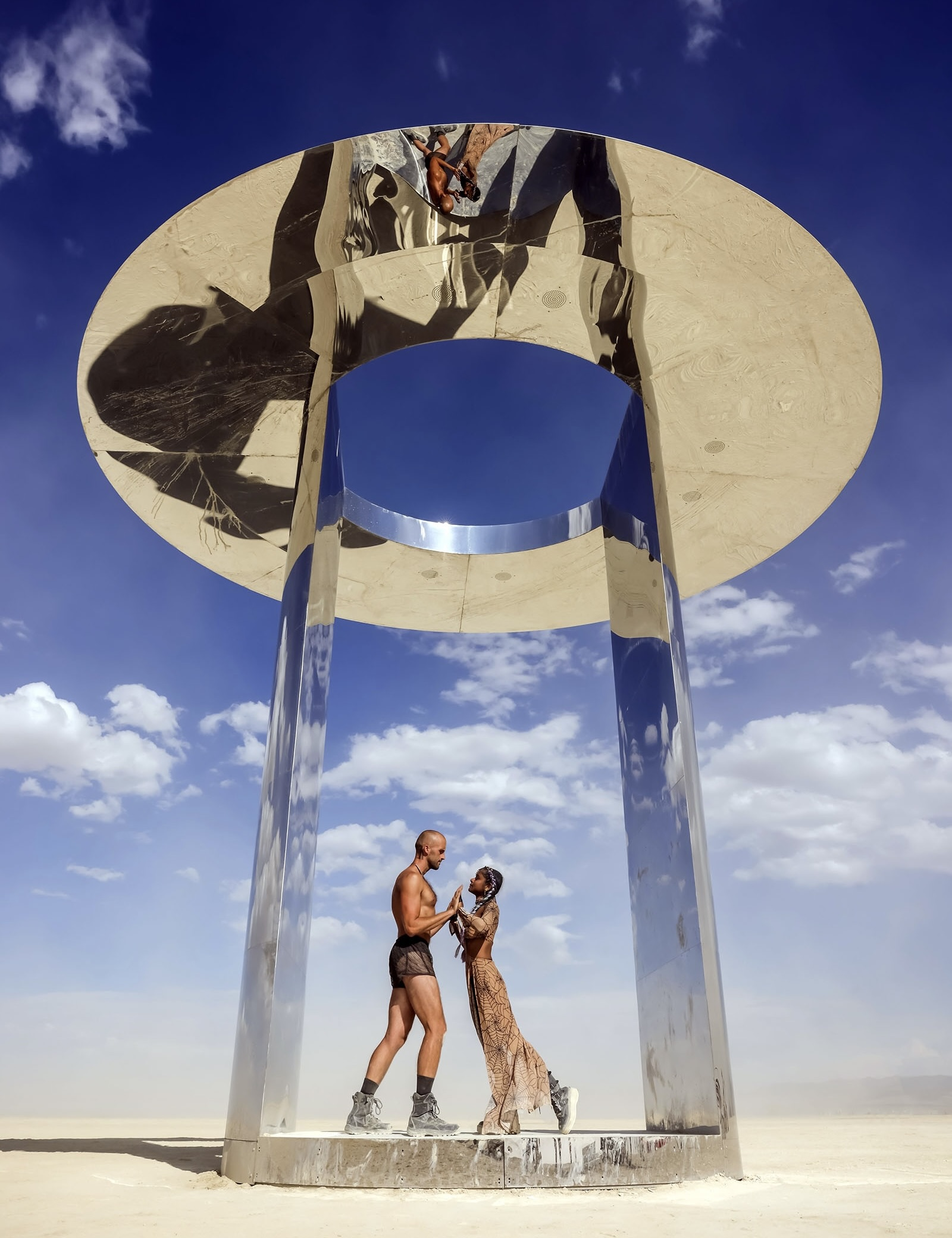
Point of Unity by Mykola Kabluka

=== Creative approach ===
Kabluka's creative approach treats light as both an engineering tool and an artistic medium. Drawing on his background in mathematical modelling and lighting design, he combines technical systems with spatial, optical, and emotional aspects of perception. His projects often use light, sound, reflective materials, digital technologies, and interactive systems to shape how viewers experience a site. In interviews, he has described light as a means of changing the perception of objects and spaces without altering their physical form. His installations and memorial projects also emphasize context, viewer presence, and non-literal forms of commemoration, using abstraction and immersion to address collective memory and public space.

== Awards and honours ==
Projects by Mykola Kabluka and Expolight have received international and national awards, including the LIT Lighting Design Awards, the IES Illumination Awards, the IALD International Lighting Design Awards, and the Ukrainian Urban Awards.
