= Vanessa Brady =

English interior designer and businesswoman

- Born: 1959 (age 66–67); Dorset, England
- Occupation: Interior designer
- Awards: Order of the British Empire (2014), Honorary Doctorate (2015)
- Website: vanessa-brady.com

Vanessa Brady OBE (born 1959) is an English interior designer and businesswoman with commercial interests spanning property, construction, furniture, publishing and academia. As the Founder and owner of the Society of British and International Interior Design (SBID), Brady established the SBID International Design Awards, eSociety magazine and the International Design Yearbook. Vanessa is also one of the three equal shareholders of PopMaster with Ken Bruce and Phil Swern.

== Early life ==
She was born and also grew up in Dorset.

== Professional life ==
In 1982, she established her first design showroom at Marble Arch and in 2002 she launched Interior Design Services Ltd, an ISO 9001 design practice based in central London. Since then, her clients have included Hard Rock Cafe, the Design Council, the Kabaret Club, British Luxury Club, Unilever, high-security government offices, His Majesty The Sultan of Brunei state palaces of the Saudi Arabia Crown Princess and King and the private residences of diplomats. From 2006 – 2015 Brady became the Finance Director at the apolitical Diplomatic Security Service (DSS).

Licensed by the Office of Fair Trading (OFT) 2003 [now the Financial Conduct Authority (FCA)] and Corporate Governance qualification (2002), Brady represents the interests of interior design at cross-party meetings at the House of Commons and the House of Lords.

Brady is the British Ambassador for Design to France for the hospitality sector and works with the Department for International Trade in Europe; particularly in France and Italy, as well as in the Middle East, USA and Canada.

She is an advisory board member for the International Council for Caring Communities which has Special Consultative Status with the Economic and Social Council of the United Nations.

== The Society of British International Design ==
In 2009, Brady founded the Society of British International Design (SBID) as an organisation for professional British interior design.

== Awards and honours ==
In 2022, Brady received the Freedom of the City of London. In 2014 she was awarded an honorary degree from Southampton Solent University. In June 2014 she was appointed an OBE in recognition of her services to the interior design industry and the UK economy in the Queen's Birthday Honours List.

She has been acknowledged for a number of business and design awards, including the 2013 Woman in the city, Woman of Achievement Award for the Built Environment.

== Media work and appearances ==
She has written for London Property Magazine, Yacht Investor, and SKY NEWS Paper review. She is also a public speaker and has been an awards judge in the design profession. Irish Fit Out Awards, KBB Awards, and Leaf Awards.

== Charitable work ==
She is the founder and a trustee of the Vanessa Brady Foundation, a charity that brings business and industry leaders together to promote emerging creative talent. She supports improvement for disability in design for the Soldiering On Through Life Trust and Help for Heroes. She created a national shared programme addressing the adaption of homes for the needs of injured military personnel and has been involved with the Be Open Foundation
