= Ben van Berkel =

Dutch architect (born 1957)

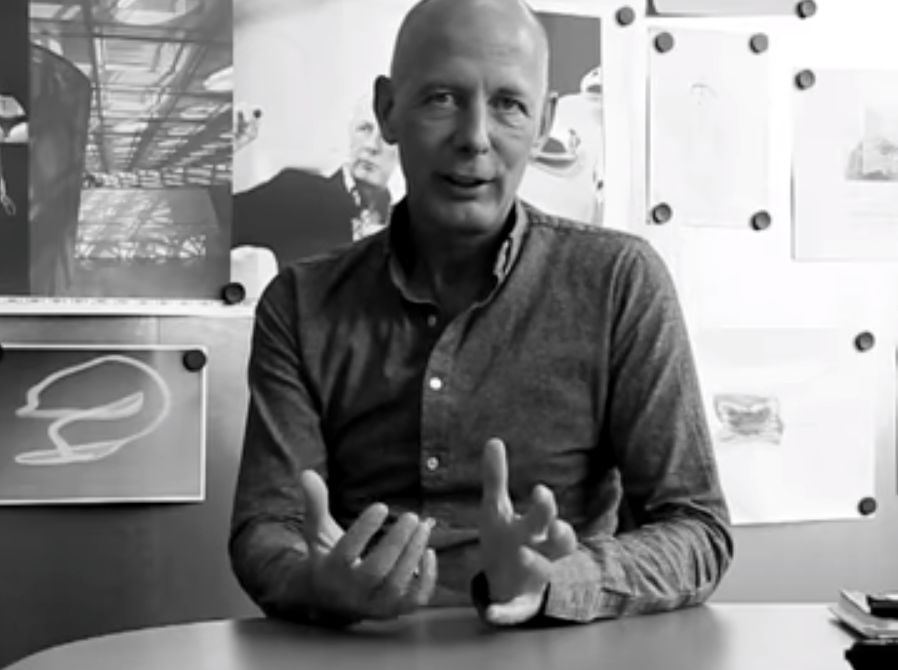
- Ben van Berkel, 2017
- Born: January 25, 1957 (age 69); Utrecht, Netherlands
- Occupation: Architect
- Awards: A&W Architect of the Year 2017 KUBUS Award 2016; Honorary Fellowship AIA 2013; RIBA International Fellowship 2009; Charles Jencks Award 2007; 1822-Kunstpreis 2003; Charlotte Köhler Award 1991 Eileen Gray Award 1983
- Practice: UNStudio
- Buildings: Moebius House; Erasmus Bridge; Mercedes-Benz Museum; Gelleria Center City (Cheonan-si, South Korea)

Ben van Berkel (born January 25, 1957) is a Dutch architect. He is the founder and principal architect of the architectural practice UNStudio. With his studio he designed, among others, the Erasmus Bridge in Rotterdam, the Moebius House in the Netherlands, the Mercedes-Benz Museum in Stuttgart, Germany, Arnhem Central Station, the Singapore University of Architecture and Design, Raffles City in Hangzhou and numerous other buildings.

== Biography ==
Ben van Berkel studied architecture at the Rietveld Academy in Amsterdam, and at the Architectural Association in London, receiving the AA Diploma with Honours in 1987.

In 1988 he and Caroline Bos set up an architectural practice in Amsterdam named Van Berkel & Bos Architectuurbureau, which realized, amongst other projects, the Karbouw office building and the Erasmus Bridge in Rotterdam. In 1998 van Berkel and Bos relaunched their practice as UNStudio, where UN stands for "United Network".

Ben van Berkel has lectured and taught at many architectural schools around the world. He has led Diploma Units at the Berlage Institute in Rotterdam (1992-1993) and the Architectural Association in London (1999). Before his role as dean at the Städelschule in Frankfurt (2001-2016), he was Visiting Professor at Columbia University, Princeton University and Harvard University. In 2011, Ben van Berkel was appointed the Kenzo Tange Chair at the Harvard Graduate School of Design. Central to his teaching is the inclusive approach of architectural works integrating virtual and material organisation and engineering constructions.

Ben van Berkel has received many personal awards and affiliations, such as the Eileen Gray Award (1983); the British Council Fellowship (1986); the Charlotte Köhler Award (1991); Member of Honor of the Bund Deutscher Architekten (1997); the 1822-Kunstpreis 2003 (Mercedes-Benz Museum, Stuttgart) (2003); the Charles Jencks Award (2007); the Honorary Fellowship AIA (2013); and the Kubus Award (2016). Dutch Designer of the Year (2019).

== Work ==
=== Van Berkel & Bos Architectuurbureau ===
In 1988 he and Caroline Bos set up an architectural practice in Amsterdam named Van Berkel & Bos Architectuurbureau, which realized, amongst other projects, the Karbouw office building, the Erasmus Bridge in Rotterdam, Museum Het Valkhof in Nijmegen, the Moebius house, and the NMR facilities for the University of Utrecht

=== UNStudio ===
In 1998, van Berkel and Bos relaunched their practice as UNStudio, the UN standing for "United Network". UNStudio presents itself as a network of specialists in architecture, urban development and infrastructure.

With UNStudio, van Berkel has built several projects, including the Mercedes-Benz Museum in Stuttgart, an LED media façade (designed with Rogier van der Heide) and interior renovation for the Galleria Department store in Seoul, Korea, and a private villa in up-state New York, the Arnhem Central Station, Canaletto Tower in London and Raffles City in Hangzhou, China. Current projects are Doha Metro Network in Qatar, the Scotts Tower in Singapore, the Hanwha Headquarters in Seoul and ‘Four’, a new mixed-use development in the heart of Frankfurt.

=== Publications ===
Delinquent Visionaries (1993)

In Delinquent Visionaries Ben van Berkel and Caroline Bos investigate the changing perspective of architecture. This collection of fifteen essays on subjects ranging from the language and notation of architecture to contemporary architects such as Santiago Calatrava, Daniel Libeskind, Nigel Coates and Bernard Tschumi, is a tribute to the architectural imagination. 'This book should be viewed not so much as a 'visionary' collection of writings, but as a well presented accumulation of thoughts, ideas and observations. As a publication its formatting and design earnestly corroborates its contents.', according to Deborah Hauptmann in De Architect.

Mobile Forces (1994)

For this book the authors have chosen to employ the very format of the book to elucidate their architectural approach, differentiating four themes that together constitute a repertoire of new architectural definitions: Mobile Forces, Crossing Points, Storing the Detail and Corporate Compactness. All projects are headed under one of these categories.

Museum het Valkhof (1999);

The contemporary museum is a mixture of supermarket, temple and tourist attraction. This heterogeneous collection of functions imposes a great diversity of technical and structural requirements. The wide variety of the objects and works of art belonging to the different museological collections reflect the potential heterogeneity of the building. The central question with respect to the architectural design therefore concerns the insertion of a layer of coherence and continuity by way of protective netting and background to the diversity and differentiation. How to fit the extensive programme with the collections, circulation and climatic and lighting installations? And how to tie together these aspects so as to achieve an integrated whole?

Move (1999)

Architects are going to be the fashion designers of the future, dressing events to come and holding up a mirror to the world. The re-thinking of public imagination, public space and public forces transforms architects into public scientists. Their imagination is informed as much by the semi-conscious preoccupations of collective vision, such as glamour, mediation, advertising and celebrity, as by the specifics of the discipline. Architecture must engage with the banal dreams of the contemporary world, and stop presenting its products as uncontaminated objects that say only: 'architecture... Time is on the architect's side [...]’. MOVE examines the architect's new role in an environment of technological, public and economic change. The redefinition of organizational structures was the common thread running through the original three books.

UNStudio UNFold (2002)

This book documents a number of UNStudio projects and takes critical stock of a welter of previously unpublished designs: the restructuring of the station area in Arnhem, the generating station in Innsbrück, the Nuclear Magnetic Resonance (NMR) laboratory in Utrecht and the competition-winning design for the Ponte Parodi in Genoa. In this new book UN Studio have draped a personal layer over the analytical project documentation. With texts by Caroline Bos, experiments in associations and out-of-the-rut architectural photography, UNStudio UNFold immerses the reader in the firm's design process. The book appeared simultaneously with the large retrospective exhibition on the work of UNStudio from May 26 to September 29, 2002 in the Netherlands Architecture Institute.

UNStudio, Design Models (2006)

Design Models is the complete monograph of UNStudio’s output. The book begins with an essay that sets out the principles of their ‘design models’, five conceptual methods that serve as the point of departure for their broad array of project types. Divided by design model, the book's main section presents 00 concepts and buildings, presented in detail: from the initial, generative diagram through the digital-modelling process, to construction and outcome. Bookending the projects is a second essay, ‘After Image’, which contemplates the role and representation of contemporary architecture in today's visual and information culture.

Buy me a Mercedes-Benz (2006);

This book about the Mercedes-Benz Museum in Stuttgart, Germany shows how various forms of expert knowledge have been combined and interwoven to finally result in the Mercedes-Benz Museum. It gives an insight into the various ideas, experiences and ambitions behind the project. At its basis was a unique design model: the digitally programmed, three-dimensional, cross-connected trefoil. Implementing this model has resulted in a building that radically breaks with many of today's architectural conventions. The aim of the book is to allow the visitor of the Mercedes-Benz Museum to take the building home; it recreates the experience of visiting the complex, yet strongly directional structure which provides many surprising perceptual experiences.

Reflections - Small Stuff by UNStudio (2010)

Reflections, Small Stuff by UNStudio presents a selection of interiors, installations, pavilions and products from the last 20 years. The 30 projects are organised in pairs which form each other's mirror image, illustrating the idea of reflection and its manifold meanings at literal and symbolic levels. Scattered throughout the book are statements by Ben van Berkel and Caroline Bos expressing the thoughts behind each design. These texts bear witness to the theoretical richness and versatility at the basis of UNStudio's highly particular approach to architecture and design.

Spaces of Flow (e-book, 2016)

The interactive book app Spaces of Flow – Arnhem Central Station is a free complementary publication to Knowledge Matters. The first in a planned series of digital publications focused on the future of mobility, Spaces of Flow elaborates on the application and production of knowledge in the design and development of Arnhem Central Station. For the first installment, we zoom in on this complex project, illustrating how the expertise from a network of collaborators and stakeholders created a flow of knowledge that became essential to the success of the project. T Spaces of Flow app features drawings, diagrams, photographs, videos, audio commentary, animations and a detailed timeline narrating the history of Arnhem Central Station

Knowledge Matters (2016)

Published by Frame Publishers, Knowledge Matters is an exploration into a more agile form of practice - one that is scalable, relevant and opens conversations about the future of the discipline in the context of today's knowledge sharing society. It does so by critically engaging the expanded set of demands now placed upon the profession – reframing these demands as the latent potentials of performative architecture in the 21st century. These potentials are explored, realised and speculated upon through the book's 11 ‘Knowledge Tools’, with projects often appearing more than once and in various guises.

== Selected projects ==
- Erasmus Bridge (1991–1996), Rotterdam, Netherlands
- Het Valkhof Museum (1995–1998), Nijmegen, Netherlands
- Möbius House (1993–1998), Naarden, Netherlands
- Music Faculty and Theatre (1998–2009), University Graz, Graz, Austria
- VilLA NM (2000–2007), Upstate New York, United States
- Mercedes-Benz Museum (2001–2006), Stuttgart, Germany
- Theatre Agora (2002–2007), Lelystad, Netherlands
- Research Laboratory (2003–2008), University Groningen, Groningen, Netherlands
- Galleria Department Store (2003–2005), Seoul, South-Korea
- UNStudio Office Tower (2003–2010), Zuidas, Amsterdam, Netherlands
- Five Franklin Place Residential Tower (2006), New York City, United States
- Holiday Home (2006), Institute for Contemporary Art, Philadelphia, United States
- Star Place Department Store (2006–2008), Kaohsiung, Taiwan
- Education Executive Agency and Tax Offices (2007–2011), Groningen, Netherlands
- Galleria Cheonan Department Store (2008–2010), Cheonan, South Korea
- Lock Island Bridges (2008), Dubai, United Arab Emirates
- Mychair (2008), Walter Knoll
- New Amsterdam Pavilion (2008–2009), New York City, United States
- Diakonessenhuis Health Care Campus (2009), Utrecht, Netherlands
- Creative Zone Masterplan (2009), Beijing, China
- Twofour54 Media Center (2009), Abu Dhabi, United Arab Emirates
- Youturn Pavilion (2010), São Paulo Art Biennale, São Paulo, Brasil
- SitTable (2010), PROOFF
- Exhibition Motion Matters (2011), Harvard University Graduate School of Design, Cambridge, United States
- New Amsterdam Chair (2011–2011), Wilde + Spieth
- Ardmore Residence (2006–2013) Residential Tower, Singapore.
- Singapore University of Technology and Design (2010–2015), Singapore
- Scotts Tower (2010–2017), Residential Tower, Singapore
- Le Toison d'Or (2009–2016), Commercial and Residential Complex, Brussels, Belgium
- Raffles City (2008–2016), Mixed-use, Hangzhou, China
- Arnhem Central Station (1996–2015), Arnhem, Netherlands

Current projects

- Ponte Parodi (2000), Harbor Redevelopment, Genoa, Italy
- Hanwha Headquarters (2013), remodeling, Seoul, South Korea
- Yongjia WTC (2013), Mixed-use, China
- Doha Metro Network (2012), Metro Stations, Doha, Qatar

== Selection publications ==
- 1992. Ben van Berkel, 010 Publishers, Rotterdam
- 1995. Ben van Berkel, El Croquis, Madrid
- 2003. Antonello, Marotta, Ben van Berkel, La Prospettiva rovesciata di UN Studio, Testo & Immagine, Torino
- 2003. Carnevali, C., Delbene, G., Patteeuw, V., Geno(v)a, Developing and rebooting a waterfront city, NAi Publishers, Rotterdam
- 2004. Love it. Live it, DAMDI Architecture Publishers, Seoul
- 2004. Gannon, Todd, UNStudio Erasmus Bridge, Princeton Architectural Press
- 2006. Bauwelt 17. This issue of Bauwelt is dedicated to the Mercedes-Benz Museum in Stuttgart
- 2010. Sollazzo, Andrea, Van Berkel Digitale - Diagrammi, Processi, Modelli Di UNStudio, EdilStampa, Rome
- 2012. UNStudio in Motion, Published by: Phoenix Publishing and Media Group, Tianjin Ifengspace Culture &Media Co., Ltd
- 2012 Leichte Stahlbetontragwerke mit gro[sz]en Spannweiten.(Report). (2012). Beton Und Stahlbetonbau, 107(12), 846–854

== Quotes ==
- With UN Studio we have learnt to see projects as public constructions and we have organized ourselves as a flexible platform organization, in which a 'public scientist', an architect as the co-coordinating, networking expert of the public realm, has replaced the Baumeister.
  - Ben van Berkel in: A + U: architecture and urbanism. Vol 404–405. 2004
- Innovation exists! You just have to accept that today you can't innovate on your own. Real, significant, innovation occurs mostly when several people simultaneously have the same idea and mysteriously move in the same direction, following subliminally emitted and received signals. The contemporary cultural inclination to see innovation as an inherently collaborative effort, a communal, discursive growing and groping towards the new, as consensual and shared, appears to find confirmation throughout history, going back to the Renaissance, looking at Picasso and Braque, the Surrealists, and the radical architecture groups of the 1960s and the early 1970s such as Superstudio and Archigram. So we seek the experiment of working with others, including other architects. What do we have to lose? Instead of being afraid of losing our 'identity', maybe we should be glad; let's liberate ourselves from our brands.
  - Ben van Berkel and Caroline Bos in: UN Studio - Amsterdam Architect van het jaar, 2007.
- Data technology, sensorial technology, artificial intelligence and augmented reality will enable us as architects and designers to create buildings that sense, understand and respond to the needs and behaviors of the people that work and live in them.
  - Ben van Berkel in: Industry Leaders Magazine, June 2019.
- Architects, designers and urban planners need to work alongside innovative developers, city councils and teams of experts from different fields to find and test real life, integral solutions to current challenges in the built environment.
  - Ben van Berkel in: Industry Leaders Magazine, June 2019.
