= Zelda Kaplan =

- Born: Zelda Berkowitz; June 20, 1916; Flemington, New Jersey, U.S.
- Died: February 15, 2012 (aged 95); New York City, New York, U.S.
- Occupations: Socialite, fashion icon, humanitarian
- Spouse: Dr. Samuel Kaplan (second husband)

Zelda Kaplan (June 20, 1916 – February 15, 2012) was a fixture in New York's art, nightclub, and fashion worlds. Her trademark outfit was a matching African-print dress, handbag, and shoes, and a tall cloth hat.

She made numerous philanthropic and humanitarian efforts, frequently traveling to Africa to speak out against female genital mutilation and campaign for the right of women to inherit; in 1995 she spoke to villages in South Africa about birth control. In regard to women's rights, she was quoted by the Village Voice as saying, "It's so important that girls not defer to the penis. I hope to let every girl know that she is somebody."

In 2003, she was profiled in The New York Times. Later that same year HBO premiered a documentary about Kaplan, Her Name Is Zelda, which followed her life from housewife to socialite. In 2006, at the age of 90, she was profiled in The Village Voice. Kaplan also once posed as a subject for her friend the photographer Andres Serrano.

== Death ==
Kaplan died in 2012, aged 95, after collapsing at a runway show for her friend the designer Joanna Mastroianni's new collection at Lincoln Center in New York City during the city's twice yearly fashion week.
