= Amy Sacco =

American club owner

Amy Sacco is an American nightclub entrepreneur, credited with launching the West 27th Street Chelsea nightlife scene and was proprietor of what was generally known as the 21st-century Studio 54. She is the founder of Lot 61 and Bungalow 8.

== Early life ==
Sacco was born around 1968 in Chatham, New Jersey, the youngest of eight children in an Italian-American family. Her father was the owner of Chatham Moving and Storage and her mother was a housewife. As a teenager, she traveled into Manhattan for the clubs like Area and the Palladium. She worked after-school jobs in restaurants and attended Johnson and Wales in Providence, Rhode Island from which she graduated in 1990.

== Career ==
Moving to New York City, Sacco worked at Bouley, then managed Lipstick Cafe and Vong (both in the Lipstick Building), managed Monkey Bar and System. During this time, she made connections and identified funding that would enable her to open her first club, Lot 61. It has been reported that it was either a stint with a venture capital firm as a marketing consultant that lead to her lucrative connections, or her former Bouley colleague, Yvonne Force, an art consultant, who introduced her to investors able to put $1.2 million forward to open Lot 61. Lot 61 opened in 1998 in a former truck garage in Chelsea on West 21st Street. The interior featured a 17-foot dot painting by Damien Hirst, a frequenter of Sacco's clubs. Sacco sold Lot 61 in 2006.

Sacco opened her second club, Bungalow 8, in the spring of 2001 in the midst of an active scrap yard in what was, at the time, an unstylish West Chelsea, on West 27th Street between 10th and 11th Avenues. By January 2002, the club appeared in season four of the cultural phenomenon HBO show, Sex and the City, the plotline focusing on the venue's famously extreme exclusivity. The "bungalow" idea Sacco used to conjure a 1950s Hollywood fantasy of the Beverly Hills Hotel with its pool-side bungalows. She wanted to invoke a sense of luxury, but most importantly, a sense of privacy for high-end celebrity patrons. Regulars included Kate Moss, George Clooney, Mick Jagger, and former president Bill Clinton. The first of a series of other locations, Bungalow 8 London opened in February 2007. She ran the company until 2008, when it was bought and later rebranded as another venture by a New York company.

She has also run Bette, a New York restaurant that she named after her mother..
