= Society of British and International Interior Design =

British interior design society

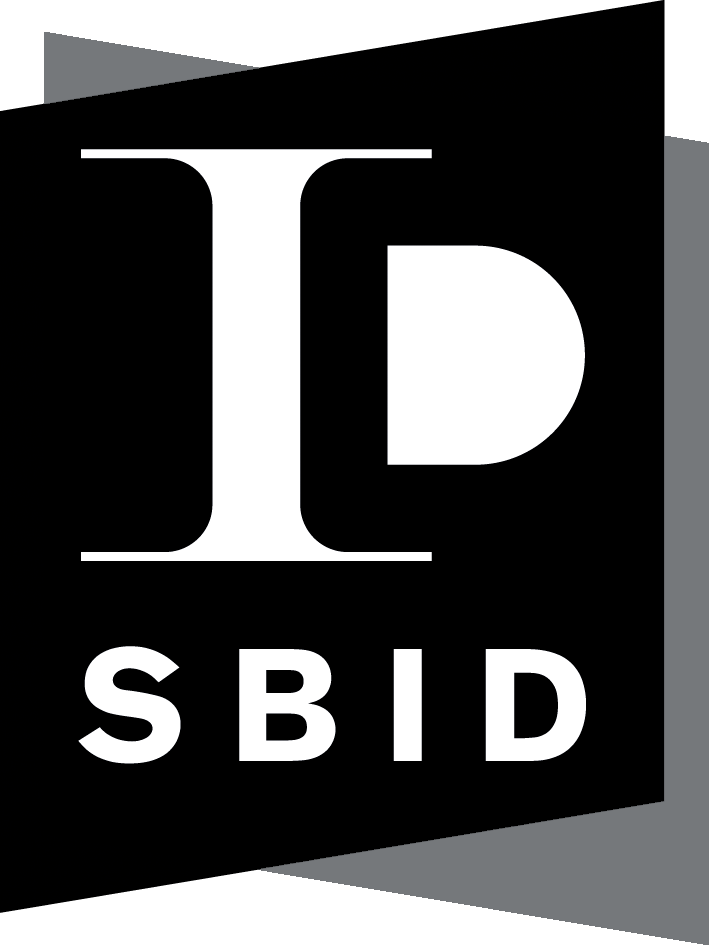
- Industry: Interior design
- Services: Professional Interior Design Accreditation, Interior Design Awards Provider, Accredited Industry Training Provider

The Society of British and International Interior Design (SBID) is the professional organisation and accreditation body to the interior design profession, operating across commercial and residential design sectors.

SBID was founded in 2009 by Vanessa Brady.

== History ==
In 2014, SBID took its first formal steps to address the specific criteria and skills of an interior designer defining the core content for training at degree course level by drafting five course modules which were recognised by the Higher Education Statistics Agency (HESA) the five modules were endorsed by HESA's Unistats Dataset and adopted at Solent University. In 2016, it submitted a formal application to the Privy Council aiming to bring interior design as a profession under government control. In 2017 it launched the SBID Intellectual Property initiative in partnership with IP anti-crime organisation TM Eye.

== Mission ==
SBID was established by Brady aiming to prevent consumers from being misled by claims from interior design hobbyists as trained professionals, and due to the lack of a clear definition of what a professional interior designer skills should be.

== Accreditations ==
To ensure competence in practice and public safety, SBID Accredited Designers must adhere to its Code of Conduct; hold valid Professional Indemnity Insurance; and are provided with access to a suite of Professional Service Contacts in partnership with NEC for the appointment of interior design services.

== SBID International Design Awards ==
The SBID International Design Awards were launched in 2010. The event aims to recognise, reward and celebrate design excellence across a broad range of categories. In 2018 the Awards drew industry talent from 46 countries across the globe, with winning projects from the UK, South Africa, China, New Zealand, Canada and UAE.
