= LDV Hospitality =

American restaurant group

LDV Hospitality is a restaurant group based in New York City, founded in 2008 by John Meadow. As of March 2018, LDV has 28 restaurants across the U.S. and in London, including flagship Modern Italian restaurant Scarpetta, which received a three star review from The New York Times. LDV restaurants are located in New York, Miami Beach, The Hamptons, Newport, Buckhead Atlanta, Philadelphia, Las Vegas and London.
