= UNStudio =

Practice information
- Key architects: Ben van Berkel; Caroline Bos; Astrid Piber; Gerard Loozekoot; Hannes Pfau
- Founded: 1988
- Location: Amsterdam, Netherlands

Significant works and honors
- Buildings: Mercedes-Benz Museum, Stuttgart (2001-2006)
- Projects: Erasmus Bridge, Rotterdam (1990-1996)

Website
- https://www.unstudio.com/

UNStudio (formerly Van Berkel en Bos Architectenbureau) is a Dutch architectural practice specializing in architecture, urban development and "infrastructural" projects. The practice was founded in 1988 by Ben van Berkel and Caroline Bos. The initials "UN" stand for United Network, a reference to the collaborative nature of the practice comprising individuals from various countries with backgrounds and technical training in numerous fields. In 2009 UNStudio Asia was established, with its first offices located in Shanghai and Hong Kong. UNStudio Asia is a full service office with a multinational team of all-round and specialist architects and is intricately connected to UNStudio Amsterdam. Further offices are located in Frankfurt, Dubai and Melbourne. UNStudio has an average work-force of 250+ employees and a management team made up of two co-founders and three partners, Astrid Piber, Gerard Loozekoot and Hannes Pfau.

== Work ==
Based in Amsterdam, UNStudio has worked internationally since its inception and has produced a wide range of work ranging from public buildings, infrastructure, offices, living, products, to urban masterplans.

UNStudio projects include:

- The office complex for the Education executive Agency and Tax Office in Groningen, Netherlands (under construction in 2011)
- Erasmus Bridge, Rotterdam (1990–1996)
- Electricity substation Amersfoort, Netherlands (1994)
- The office complex La Defense, Almere (1999–2004)
- The Möbius House, Gooi region (1993–1998)
- Electricity substation in Innsbruck, Austria (2002)
- The new Mercedes-Benz Museum in Stuttgart (2001–2006)
- Theatre Agora in Lelystad (2002–2007)
- VilLA NM, Sullivan County, New York, destroyed by fire in 2008
- Five Franklin Place, New York City
- MYchair for Walter Knoll
- Star Place luxury shopping plaza in Kaohsiung, Taiwan
- Music Theatre (MUMUTH) in Graz, Austria
- Burnham Pavilion, Chicago
- David the Builder Kutaisi International Airport, Kutaisi, Georgia
- Arnhem Centraal railway station, Netherlands (1996-2015)
- 18 September Square Renovation, Netherlands
- Doha Metro Network Stations, Qatar
- Eclipse, Düsseldorf, Germany (in collaboration with HPP Architekten)
- Echo building of Delft University of Technology, Delft, the Netherlands (2022)
- Dadu Children's Museum, Doha, Qatar (2023)
- Wasl Tower, Dubai, United Arab Emirates (2024)
- Four Frankfurt, Frankfurt, Germany (2025)

== Former staff architects ==
- Australian Institute of Architects award-winning architect Andrew Benn

== Awards ==
- World Winners Prix Versailles 2018

== Projects gallery ==
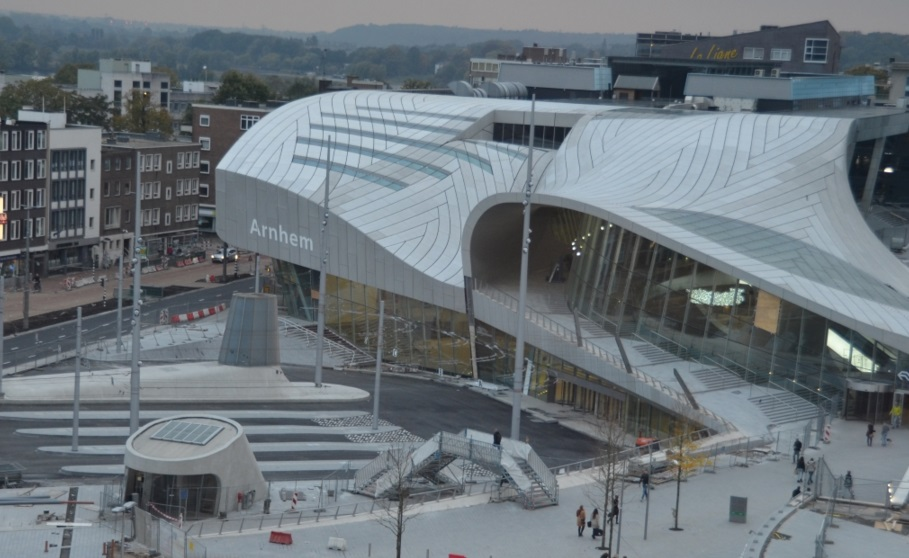
Arnhem Centraal station, Netherlands

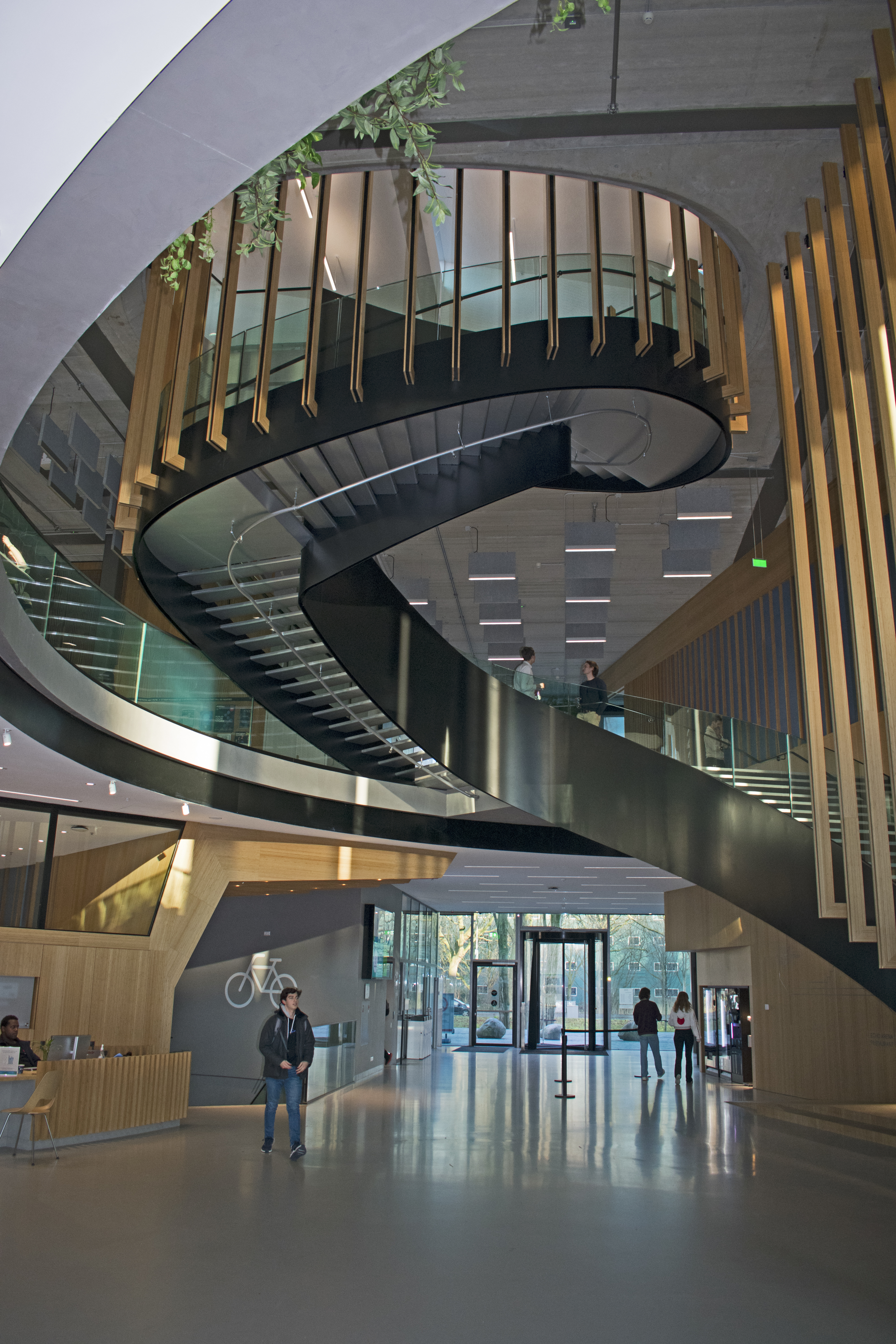
Echo building, Delft University of Technology, the Netherlands

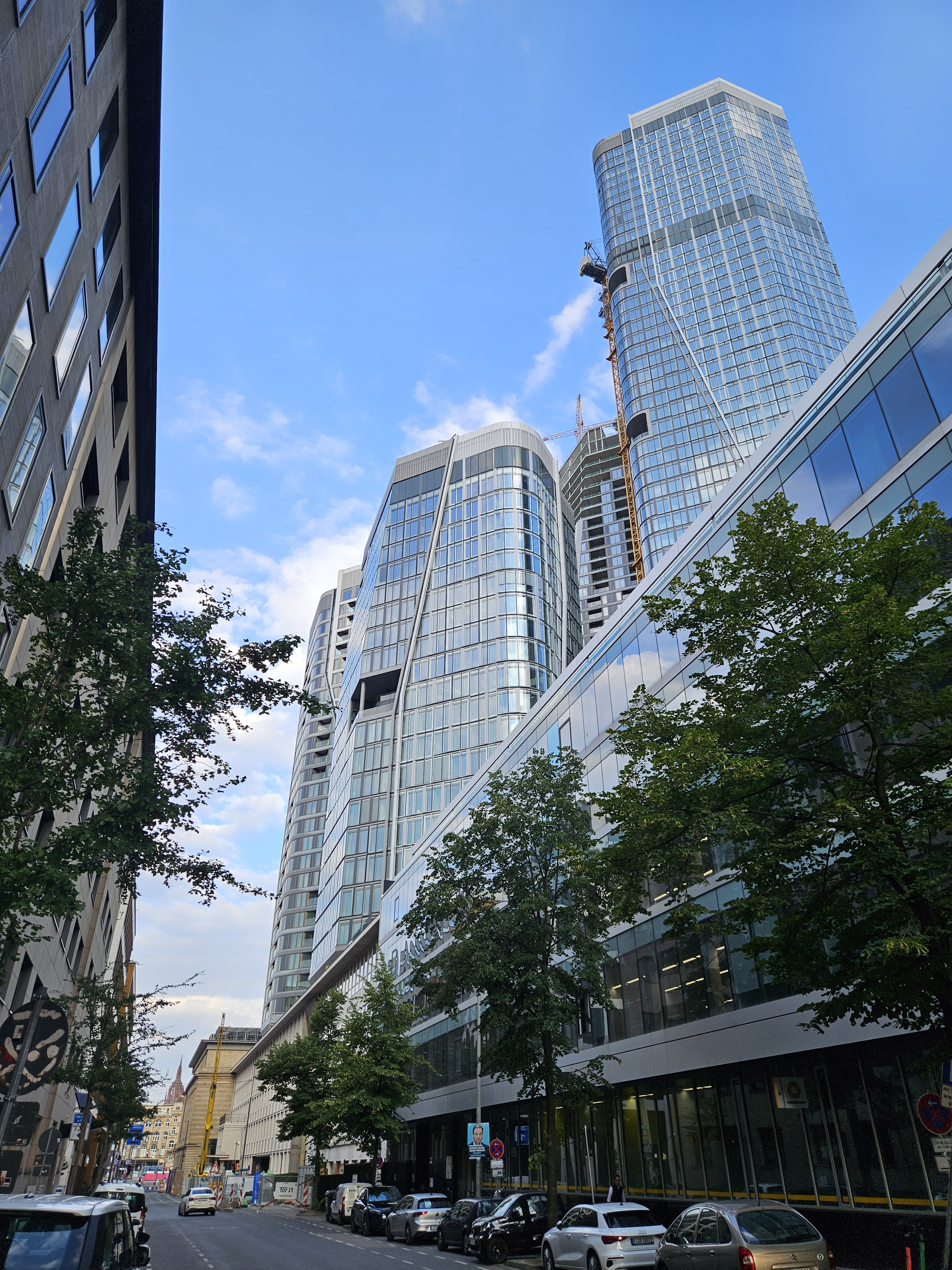
Four Frankfurt, Germany
