= Dream (sculpture) =

Sculpture by Jaume Plensa

Coordinates: 53.41°N 2.7222°W

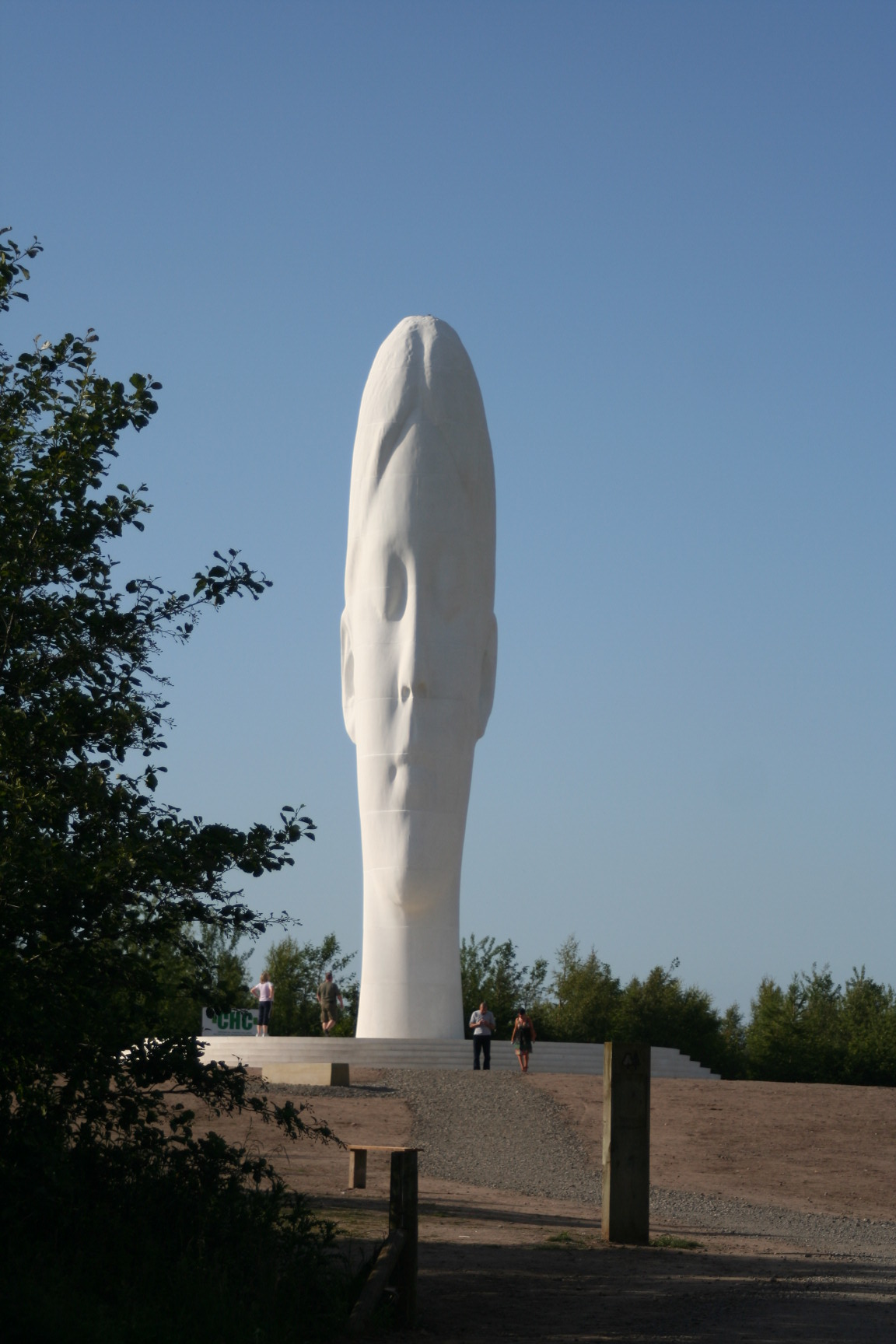
- Artist: Jaume Plensa
- Year: 2009
- Type: Dolomite on cast concrete
- Location: Sutton Manor Colliery, St Helens

Dream is a sculpture and a piece of public art by Jaume Plensa in Sutton, St Helens, Merseyside. Costing approximately £1.8m (equivalent to £3.05 million in 2023), it was funded through The Big Art Project in coordination with the Arts Council England, The Art Fund and Channel 4.

== Origin ==
In 2008 St Helens took part in Channel 4's "The Big Art Project" along with several other sites. The project culminated in the unveiling of Dream, a 66-foot-high (20 m) sculpture located on the old Sutton Manor Colliery site.

St Helens retains strong cultural ties to the coal industry and has several monuments including the wrought iron gates of Sutton Manor Colliery, as well as the 1995 town centre installation by Thompson Dagnall known as "The Landings" (depicting individuals working a coal seam) and Arthur Fleischmann's Anderton Shearer monument (a piece of machinery first used at the Ravenhead Mine).

The council and local residents (including approximately 15 former miners from the colliery) were involved in the consultation and commission process through which Dream was selected. The plans involved a full landscaping of the surrounding area on land previously allowed to go wild after the closure of the pit.

== The sculpture ==
Dream consists of an elongated white structure 66 feet (20 m) tall, weighing 500 tonnes (490 long tons; 550 short tons), which has been cast to resemble the head and neck of a young woman with her eyes closed in meditation. The structure is coated in sparkling white Spanish dolomite, as a contrast to the coal which used to be mined here. It cost nearly £1.9 million and it is hoped it will become as powerful a symbol in North West England as Antony Gormley's Angel of the North is in North East England.

Jaume Plensa himself stated "When I first came to the site I immediately thought something coming out of the earth was needed. I decided to do a head of a nine-year-old girl which is representing this idea of the future. It's unique."

The original design of the sculpture called for a skyward beam of light from the top of the head, and the sculpture's working title was Ex Terra Lucem ("From the ground, light"), a reference to St Helens' previous motto. Due to objections from the Highways Agency, the sculpture was not lit, but in 2010 a new planning application was submitted to St Helens Council for it to be floodlit.

For this work Plensa received the 2009 Marsh Award for Excellence in Public Sculpture.

== Construction ==
The Dream sculpture is built out of moulded and cast unique concrete shapes, 90 pieces in all contributing to over 14 tiers (54 individual elements for the head, each weighing 9 tonnes (8.9 long tons; 9.9 short tons)). Dolomite was utilised as a concrete aggregate in order to provide the brilliant white finish. Additionally titanium dioxide was added to the mix in order to provide a self-cleaning mechanism. The construction required the construction of individual moulds for each piece and took a total of 60 days to cast.

The foundations of the sculpture extend 125 feet (38 m) into the ground with 8 piles driven in to secure it.

== Location ==
The sculpture is sited on an old spoil tip of Sutton Manor Colliery which closed in 1991 and it overlooks the M62 motorway. Prospective visitors may download audio guides and smartphone apps before visiting.

== See also ==
- Dreaming - A similar sculpture in Toronto
- Echo - A similar sculpture in Seattle
- Water's Soul - A similar sculpture in Jersey City, New Jersey
