= Water's Soul =

Sculpture by Jaume Plensa in Jersey City

- Artist: Jaume Plensa
- Year: 2020 official opening October 19, 2021
- Type: Polyester resin fiberglass
- Dimensions: 24 m (80 ft)
- Location: Hudson River Waterfront Walkway; Jersey City, New Jersey
- Coordinates: 40°43′51″N 74°01′42″W

Water's Soul is a sculpture along the Hudson River Waterfront Walkway in the Newport section of Jersey City, New Jersey. It depicts a woman with closed eyes holding a finger to her lips in a state of silent contemplation and self-reflection. The work was conceived by Jaume Plensa and commissioned by LeFrak and Simon Property Group. Made of polyester resin, fiberglass, and marble dust, the work is white and stands 80 feet (24 m) tall. It faces the Hudson River and the New York City skyline. It was created at Plensa's Barcelona studio and shipped in 23 containers, each 40 feet (12 m) feet long, to the site.

Of the work, Plensa stated, "It is my wish for Water’s Soul to become an icon for Newport and a landmark that visually connects it with New York City across the Hudson River. Just as Water’s Soul acts to unite the city of Jersey City and New York City, we are reminded that water is the great public space that unites and embraces communities as well as people around the world." "The water, when it moves, makes a special sound, very special," Plensa said in an interview, suggesting the sculpture's message is "to keep silent...to listen to the profound noise of the water talking to us."

== In popular culture ==
- 2023: The statue features prominently in Amazon Prime Video series Harlan Coben's Shelter.

== See also ==
- List of public art in Jersey City, New Jersey
- Dream (sculpture)
- Behind the Walls (sculpture)
