= Jaume Plensa =

Catalan artist and sculptor (born 1955)

Jaume Plensa Escultor Jaume Plensa
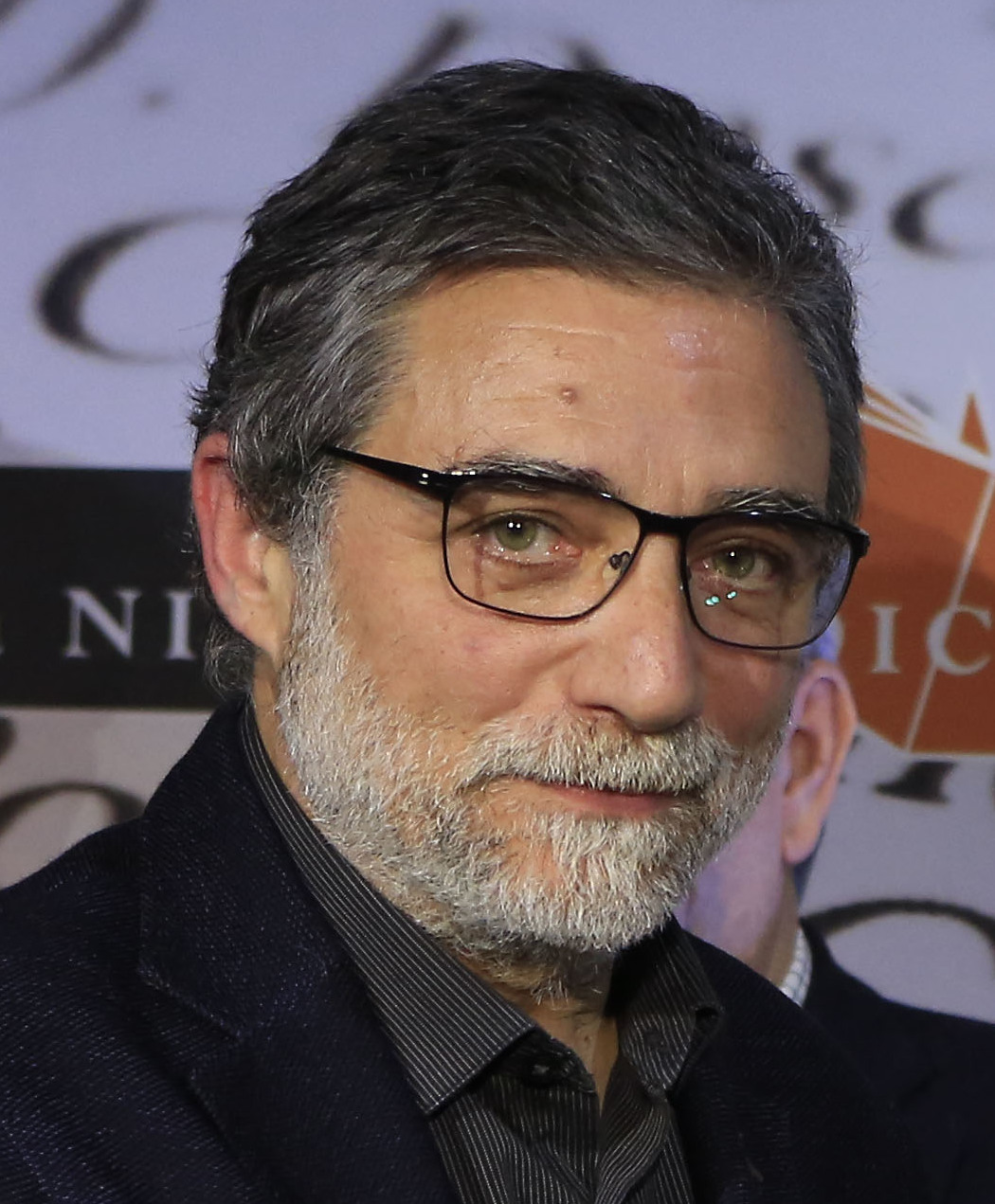
- Jaume Plensa (December 2015)
- Born: August 23, 1955 (age 71); Barcelona, Catalonia, Spain
- Education: Llotja School
- Alma mater: Escola Superior de Belles Arts de Sant Jordi
- Notable work: Crown Fountain; Blake in Gateshead; Dream
- Awards: Medaille des Chevaliers des Arts et Lettres; Investit Doctor Honoris Causa; Marsh Award for Excellence in Public Sculpture (2009); National Award for Plastic Arts (2012)

Jaume Plensa i Suñé (Catalan pronunciation: [ˈʒawmə ˈplɛnsə]; born 23 August 1955) is a Catalan visual artist, sculptor, designer and engraver. He has also created opera sets, video projections and acoustic installations.

== Biography ==
Plensa was born in Barcelona, Catalonia, Spain. He left the studies of fine arts in Barcelona and continued to train in a self-taught way.

== Works ==
Plensa's works include the Crown Fountain at Millennium Park in Chicago, Illinois, which opened in July 2004. The fountain is composed of a black granite reflecting pool placed between a pair of glass brick towers. The towers are 50 feet (15 m) tall, and they use light-emitting diodes (LEDs) to display digital videos on the inward faces. In the summer of 2007, he participated in the Chicago public art exhibit, Cool Globes: Hot Ideas for a Cooler Planet.

Another Plensa piece is Blake in Gateshead in North East England, a laser beam that on special occasions shines high into the night sky over Gateshead's Baltic Centre for Contemporary Art.

In 2007, working closely with a group of local ex-miners, he was also commissioned to create a new work on the landmark site of a former colliery near St Helens, Merseyside, as part of the Big Art Project, a major national public art initiative linked to Channel 4. Unveiled in spring 2009, Dream consists of an elongated white structure 20 metres (66 ft) tall, weighing 500 tons, which has been carved to resemble the head and neck of a young woman with her eyes closed in meditation. The structure is coated in sparkling white Spanish dolomite, as a contrast to the coal which used to be mined there.

On 16 June 2008, Plensa's sculpture of a listening glass entitled Breathing was dedicated by the incumbent Secretary-General of the United Nations, Ban Ki-moon, as a memorial to journalists killed whilst undertaking their work. The sculpture in steel and glass sits atop a new wing of Broadcasting House in London. At 22:00 GMT each evening a beam of light will be projected from the sculpture extending 1 km into the sky for 30 minutes to coincide with the BBC News at Ten.

In 2010, Plensa's Alchemist was installed in front of the Stratton Student Center, facing the main entrance of the Massachusetts Institute of Technology in Cambridge, Massachusetts. It is a large, hollow seated figure similar to other contemporary Plensa figures, except that it is composed of numerals and mathematical symbols, to honor MIT's traditional STEM-focused teaching and research. The sculpture was donated anonymously on the occasion of MIT's 150th anniversary.

On 21 September 2010, Spillover II was unveiled in Atwater Park in Shorewood, Wisconsin, United States. A 260 cm (102 in) tall statue consisting of steel letters welded together in the shape of a man on top of a concrete base.

El alma del Ebro was created for the International Exposition in Zaragoza, the theme of which was "Water and Sustainable Development". It is eleven meters high, the sculpted letters representing cells of the human body which is over 60% water. Its white letters and hollow structure invite the viewer to look inside and reflect on the relationship between human beings and water. A similar sculpture entitled Singapore Soul (2011) was installed in front of the Ocean Financial Centre in Singapore. And an ensemble piece entitled I, You, She, He... with three figures composed of the letters, each seated on large flat boulders, can be seen at the Frederik Meijer Gardens & Sculpture Park, in Grand Rapids, Michigan.

In early 2011, Tolerance was installed at Buffalo Bayou Park in Houston, Texas, and Mirror was installed on the Rice University campus.

From May to mid-August 2011, the work Echo was displayed in Madison Square Park in Manhattan.

In November 2012, the Albright–Knox Art Gallery in Buffalo, New York unveiled a 32-ton sculpture by Plensa called Laura. The 20-foot (6.1 m) tall sculpture is composed of 20 massive pieces of marble from the south of Spain. In this same year, he also created "Looking Into My Dreams, Awilda," or simply Awilda, which now sits at the Pérez Art Museum Miami.

In 2013, Plensa installed a sculpture named Ainsa I at the entrance of the Olin Business School of Washington University in St. Louis.

In 2017, Love was installed in the Frisian city of Leeuwarden, Netherlands. In the same year, Chloe was installed at the Virginia Museum of Fine Arts in Richmond. Chloe was the first of the head sculptures to be cast as one piece.

In 2019, the MACBA Museum of Contemporary Art Barcelona organized the most ambitious solo exhibition in his hometown, curated by the museum's director, Ferran Barenblit. The exhibition traveled to the Museum of Modern Art Moscow, where it achieved notable success.

In 2020, Dreaming was installed outside of the Richmond-Adelaide Centre in Toronto. Also in 2020, Behind the Walls was installed outside the University of Michigan Museum of Art.

Water's Soul (2021) is along the Hudson River Waterfront Walkway in the Newport section of Jersey City.

In 2021, Utopia was installed at the Frederik Meijer Gardens & Sculpture Park in Grand Rapids, Michigan as a part of their Welcoming the World: Honoring a Legacy of Love expansion project that began in 2017. Utopia, which is located in the Meijer Gardens' Garden Pavilion, is Plensa's largest indoor work to date. It defines the vast perimeter of the Garden Pavilion and consists of four 20-by-90-foot carved marble portraits of the faces of Marianna, Julia, Laura, and Wilsis, who are frequent subjects of Plensa's other works.

== Awards ==
- 1993: Medaille des Chevaliers des Arts et Lettres by the French Minister of Culture
- 1996: Awarded by the Fondation Atelier Calder
- 1997: National Award of Arts by the Government of Catalonia
- 2005: Investit Doctor Honoris Causa by School of the Art Institute of Chicago
- 2009 : Marsh Award for Excellence in Public Sculpture.
- 2012: Creu de Sant Jordi Award
- 2012: National Award for Plastic Arts
- 2013: Premio Nacional de Arte Gráfico
- 2013: Premio Velázquez de Artes Plásticas, by Ministerio de Cultura de España

== Gallery ==
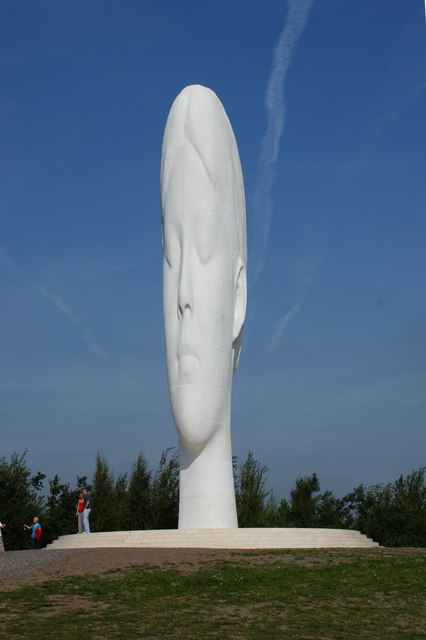
Dream (2007, St Helens, Merseyside)

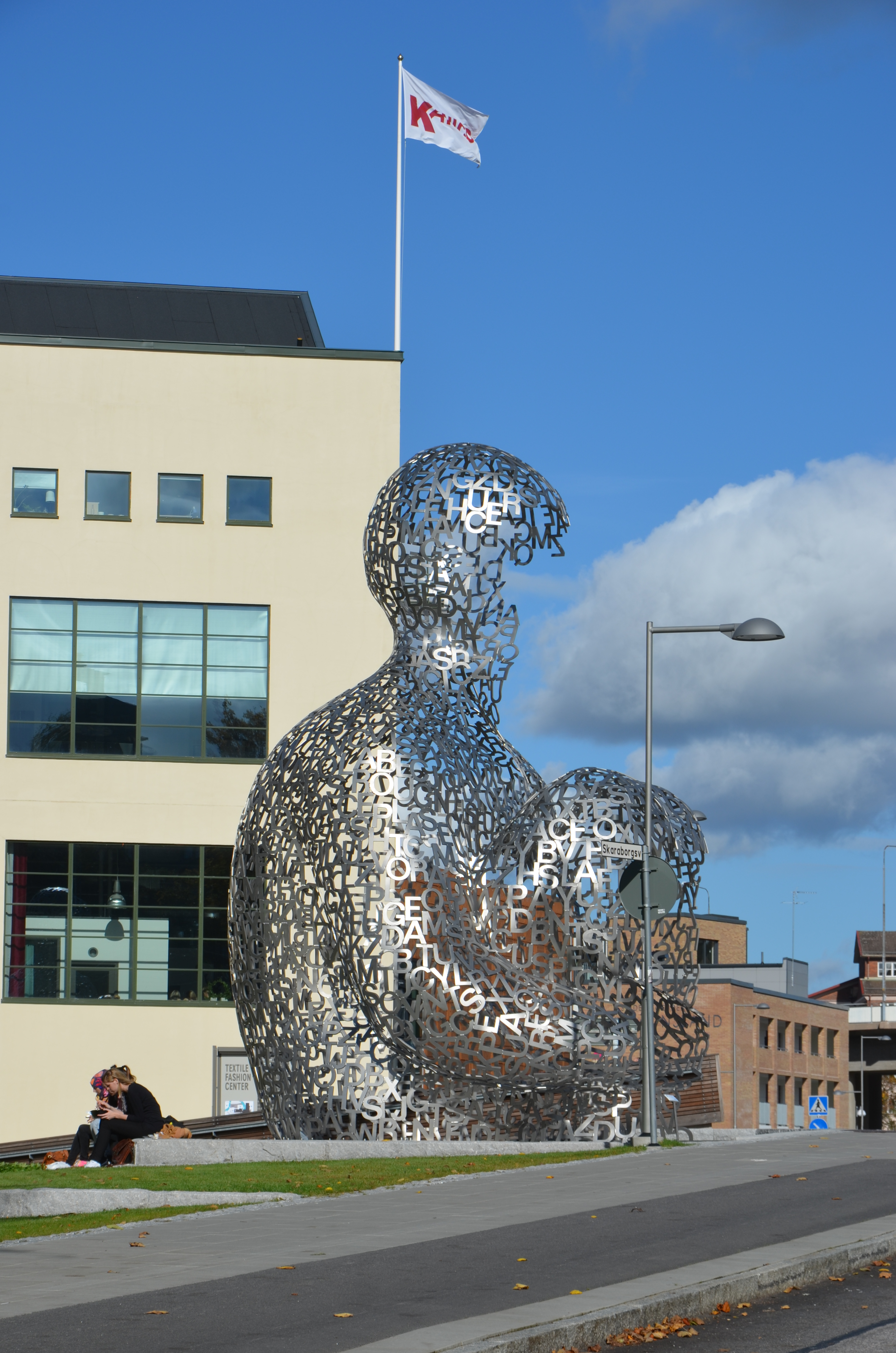
House of Knowledge in Borås, Sweden

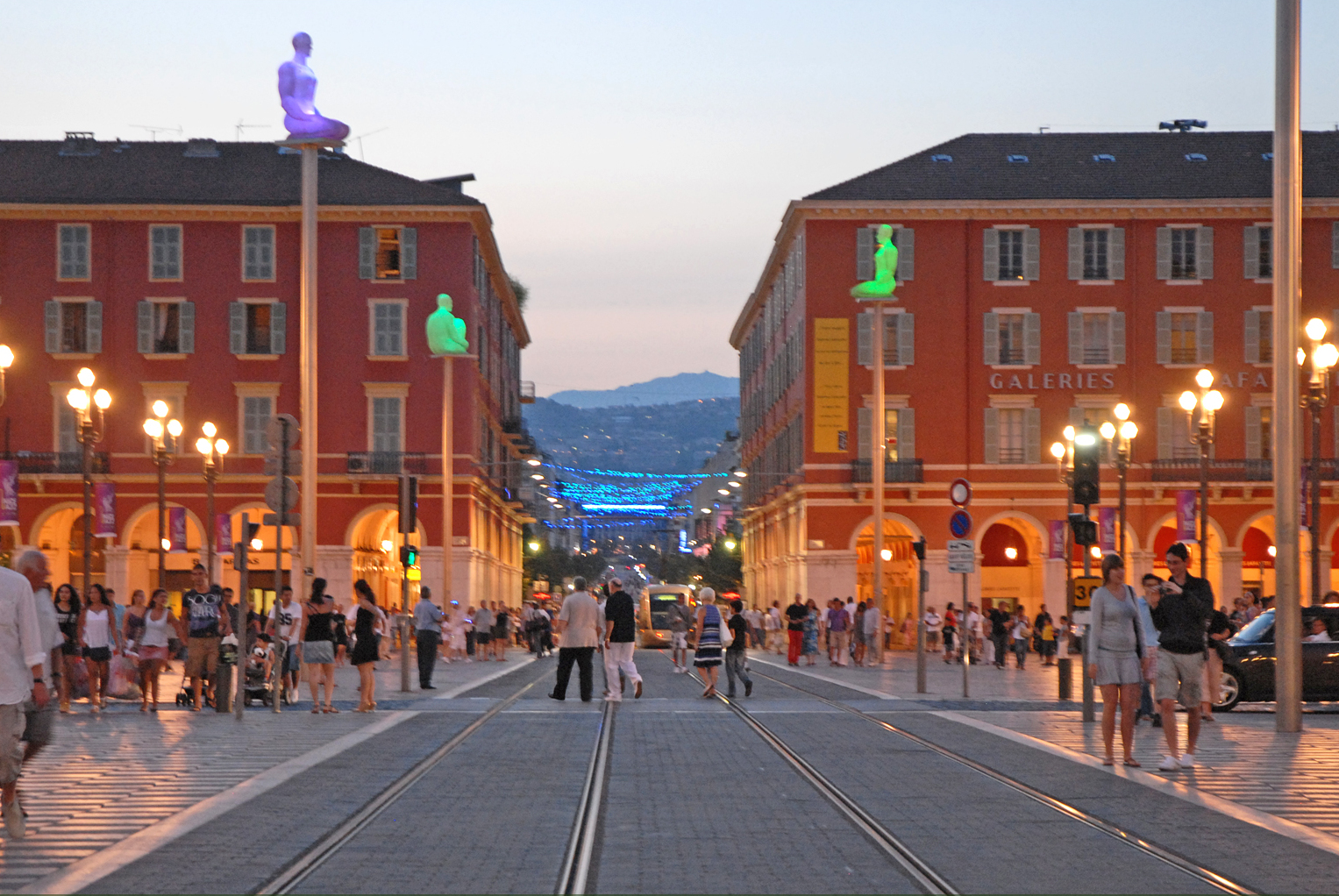
Figures representing seven continents, Nice, France

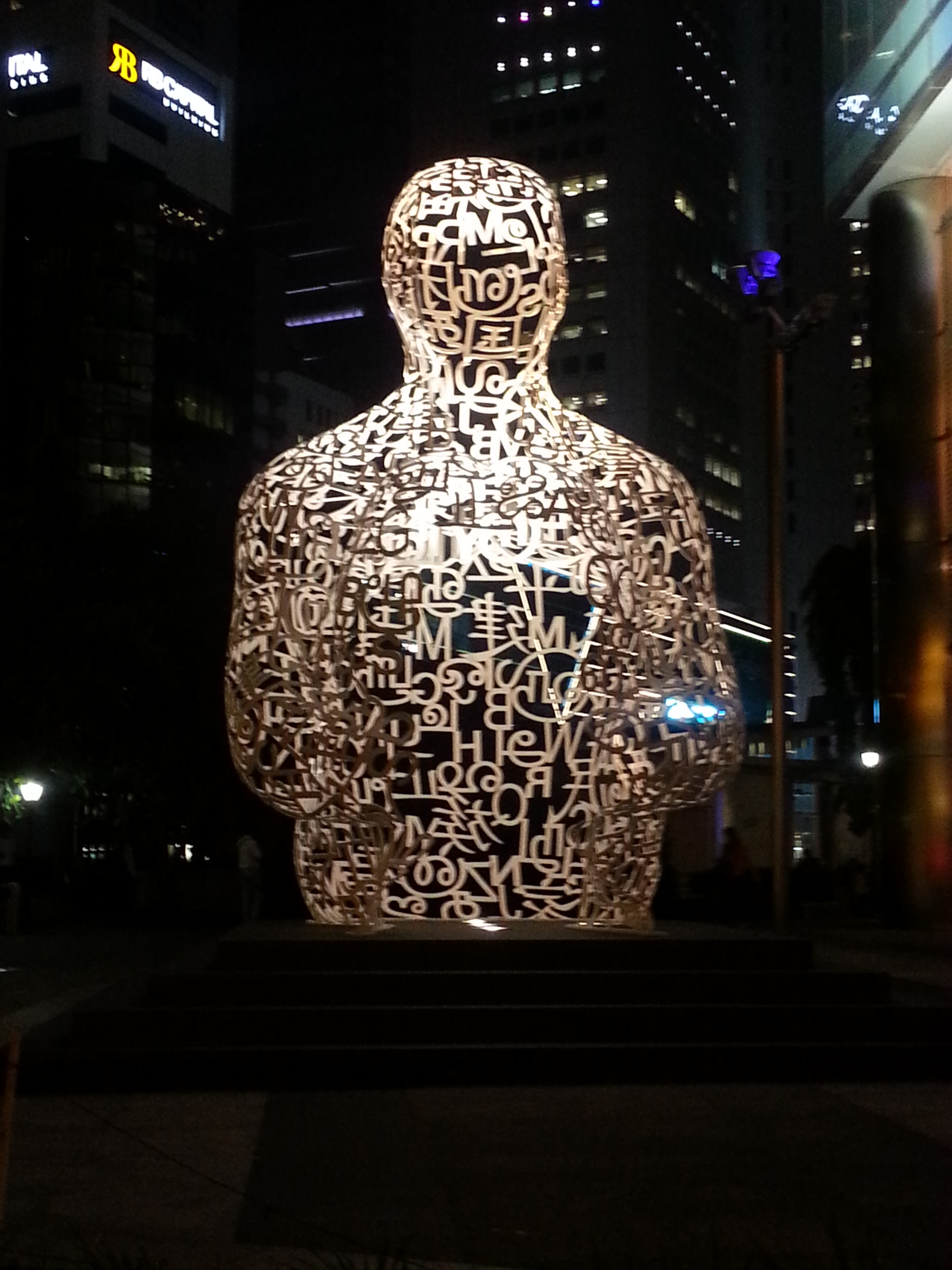
Singapore Soul (2011) at the Ocean Financial Centre, Singapore

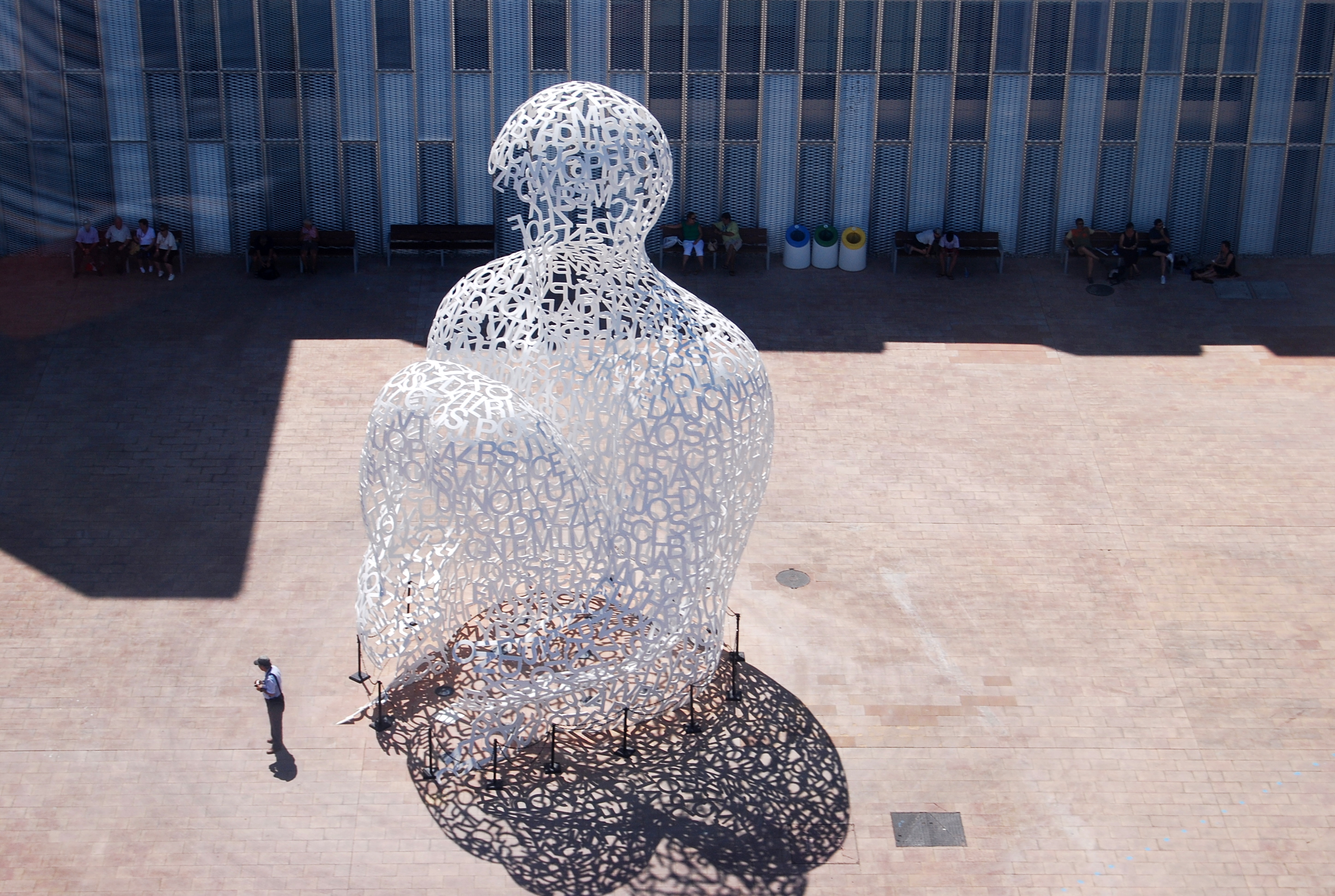
El alma del Ebro, Zaragoza, Aragon

== See also ==
- Looking Into My Dreams, Awilda
- Tolerance (sculpture), Houston, Texas (2011)
