= Singapore Soul =

2011 sculpture by Jaume Plensa in Singapore

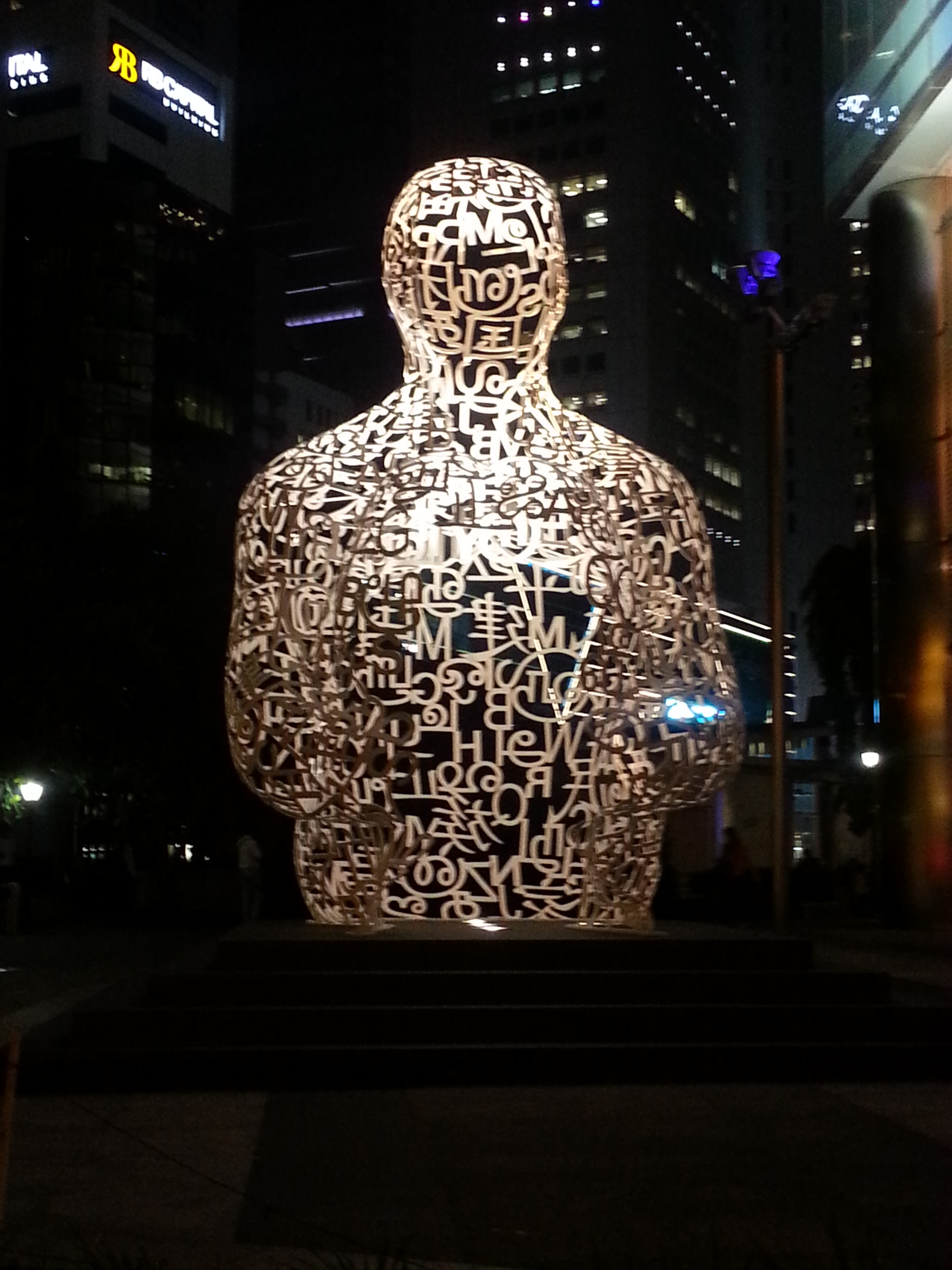
- The sculpture in 2014
- Artist: Jaume Plensa

Singapore Soul is a sculpture by Spanish artist Jaume Plensa, installed outside the Ocean Financial Centre and Raffles Place MRT station in Singapore. The painted stainless steel work was unveiled in 2011.

According to Time Out Singapore, the work "symbolically represents the cultural unity and harmony of different ethnicities in Singapore: such as the Chinese, Indians, Malays, and Eurasians". Similarly, the San Antonio Report has said the sculpture "pays tribute to the city-state's multicultural milieu".

== See also ==
- 2011 in art
