= Alchemist (Plensa) =

Sculpture by Jaume Plensa in Cambridge, Massachusetts, U.S.

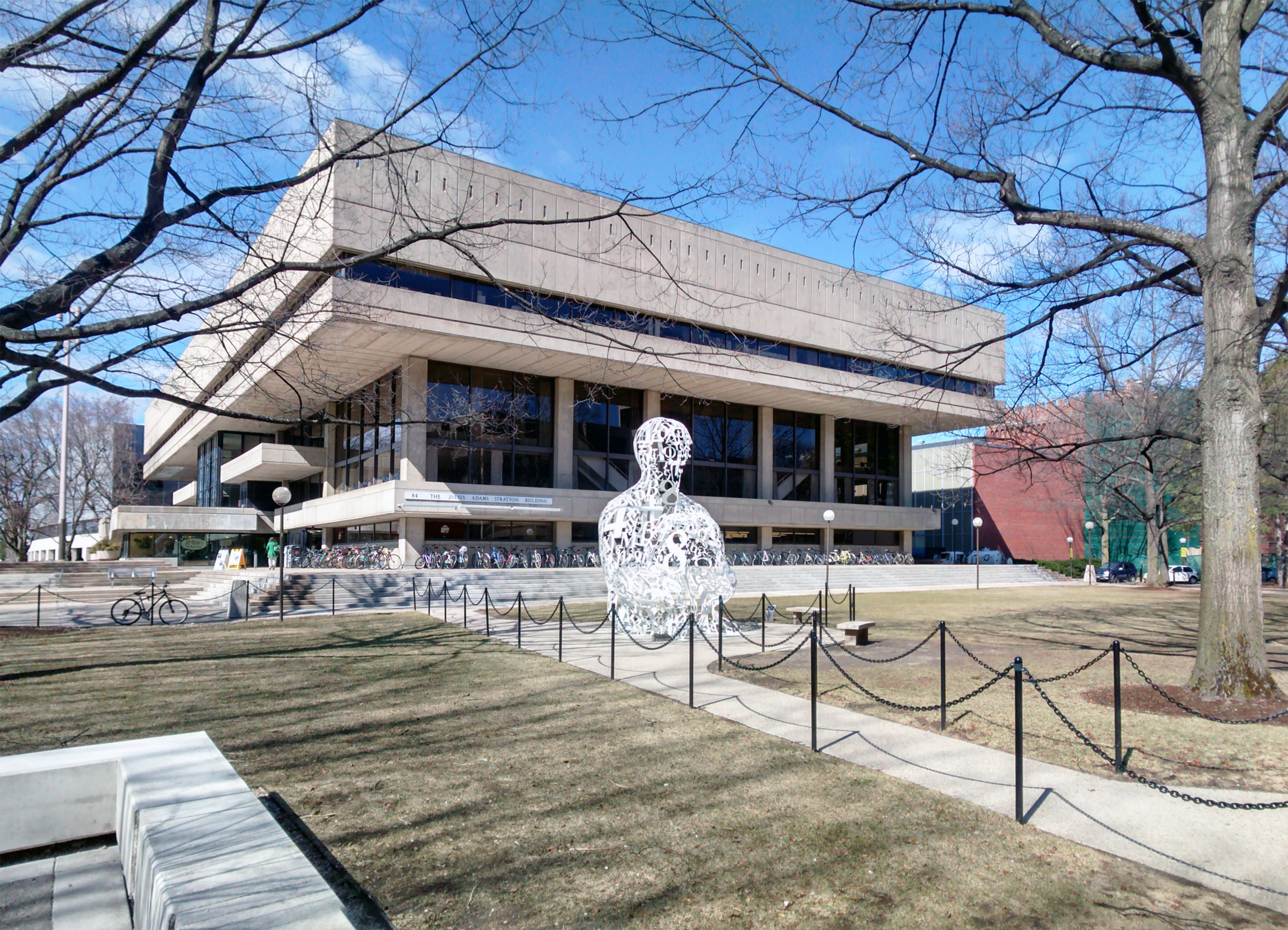
- The sculpture in 2014
- Artist: Jaume Plensa
- Year: 2010
- Medium: Stainless steel sculpture
- Location: Cambridge, Massachusetts, United States
- 42°21′32.78″N 71°5′38.5″W

Alchemist is a stainless steel sculpture by Jaume Plensa, installed on the Massachusetts Institute of Technology campus, in Cambridge, Massachusetts, United States. The work was installed in 2010.

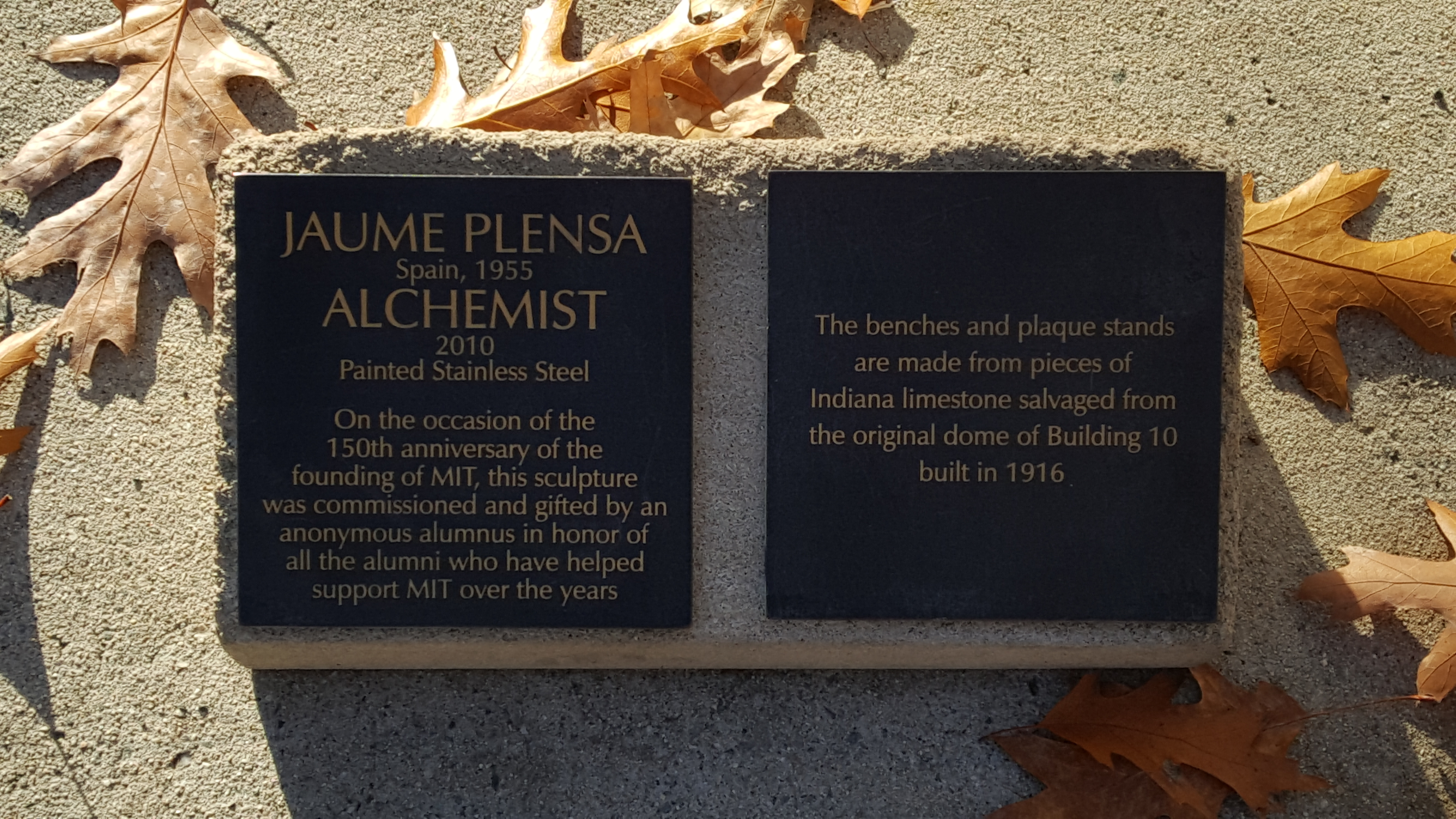
Plaque, 2019
