= Echo (sculpture) =

Sculpture by Jaume Plensa

- The sculpture in 2022
- Artist: Jaume Plensa
- Year: 2011
- Location: Seattle, Washington, U.S.; 47°36′54.9″N 122°21′20.3″W

Echo is a sculpture by Jaume Plensa, created in 2011, and installed at Seattle's Olympic Sculpture Park, in the U.S. state of Washington. It was modelled after a neighborhood girl; her face was then elongated to distort her features into the form the statue is now.
