= Breathing (memorial sculpture) =

Sculpture by Jaume Plensa

Coordinates: 51.5184°N 0.1431°W

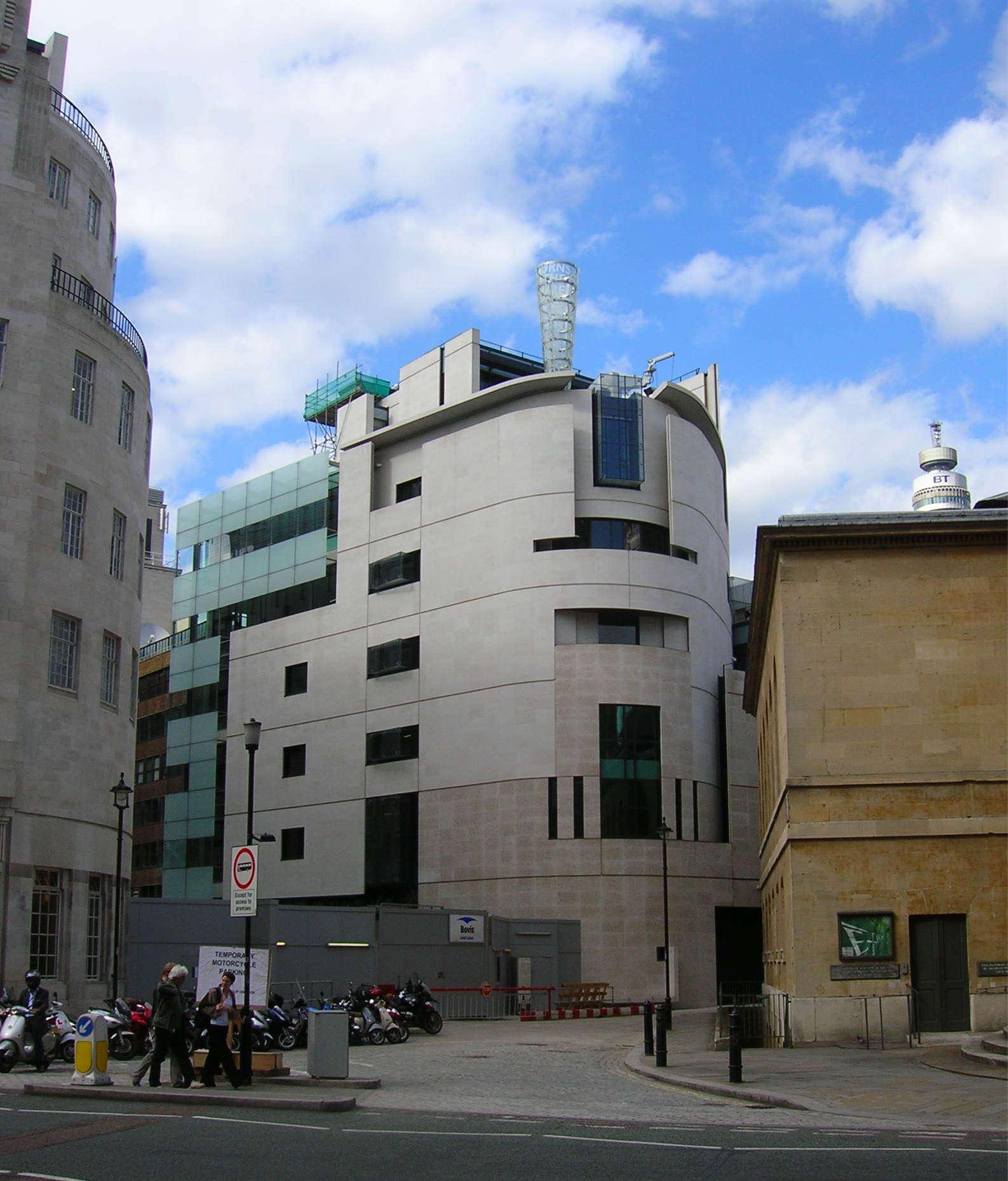
The memorial can be seen on the rooftop, in the top-centre of the picture.

Breathing is a memorial sculpture situated on the roof of the Peel Wing of BBC Broadcasting House, in London. The sculpture commemorates journalists and associated staff who have been killed whilst carrying out their work. It consists of a 10-metre (32 ft) high glass and steel column, with a torch-like, inverted spire shape, decorated with words. It also features a poem by James Fenton. At night the sculpture gently glows, then at 10 pm every evening (coinciding with the broadcast of the BBC Ten O'Clock News) the memorial shines a beam of light into the sky for 30 minutes, which reaches up to 900 metres (3,000 feet). It was reported in 2012 that the BBC was not turning the sculpture's lights on as often as it should be.

The memorial was officially unveiled on 16 June 2008 by the UN Secretary General Ban Ki-moon. The sculpture is by Spanish artist Jaume Plensa, working in collaboration with the Broadcasting House architect Sir Richard MacCormac and his team at MJP Architects, Modus Operandi public art consultants and the engineers Whitby Bird & Partners. It was commissioned and selected as a result of an international competition for the BBC's public art scheme. The shape of the sculpture is inspired by the spire of the adjoining All Souls Church, and the radio mast on the roof of Broadcasting House.

The architecture critic Ellis Woodman, of Building Design magazine, called Breathing the "most misconceived public artwork in London since the Queen Mother's gates".
