= Looking Into My Dreams, Awilda =

2012 sculpture by Jaume Plensa

- The sculpture in Chicago in 2015
- Artist: Jaume Plensa

Looking Into My Dreams, Awilda, or simply Awilda, is a 2012 sculpture by Jaume Plensa.

== Description and history ==
The 39-foot tall sculpture originally stood in the surf of Guanabara Bay in Rio de Janeiro, before being moved to Chicago's Millennium Park. It stood in Millennium Park from June 2014 until January 2016. As of March 2017, Awilda stands at the Pérez Art Museum Miami. It is composed of resin and marble dust, with a metal support structure and an internal frame of fiberglass.

Awilda is based on a real person, a Dominican girl who came to Spain with her mother, who Plensa knew in Barcelona. Plensa took her portrait with a laser scanner, capturing 3D information to manipulate and scale into larger models.

== See also ==
- List of public art in Chicago
