= Spillover II =

Sculpture by Jaume Plensa

Spillover
- Artist: Jaume Plensa
- Year: 2010
- Type: Welded openwork steel sculpture
- Dimensions: 260 cm (102 in)
- Location: Shorewood, Wisconsin, US; 43°05′21.90″N 87°52′25.73″W
- Owner: Village of Shorewood

Spillover is a public artwork by Spanish artist Jaume Plensa. It is installed in Atwater Park in Shorewood, Wisconsin, United States. It depicts an 8.5-foot (2.6 m) crouching man whose open form is made of steel letters. It is on a 2-foot (0.61 m) concrete base, and was publicly dedicated on September 21, 2010.

== Description ==
Spillover is composed of steel letters that are tack welded together. In Plensa's words, "The letters that form the open framework suggest that language is our primary tool for experiencing the world and each other, and that we are, essentially, both limited and empowered by this abstract means of translating our experiences." The work, on a concrete base at the intersection of Capitol Drive and Lake Drive, is situated with the figure looking out onto Lake Michigan. Illuminated from within, its nighttime glow acts like a beacon in Atwater Park.

== History ==
Spillover is the first artwork acquired as part of the Village of Shorewood's public art initiative, begun in 2001 by the Shorewood Public Art Committee, a subcommittee of the Community Development Authority and Public Improvements Committee. Russell Bowman, former director of the Milwaukee Art Museum and current Chicago art consultant, assisted the committee in choosing Plensa's work. Plensa is best known in the American Midwest for his Crown Fountain in Chicago's Millennium Park.

Spillover was chosen from nearly 100 other artists' works because it seemed the most appropriate for the location. Shorewood Village president Guy Johnson described it as a "wonderful gift (that) has given us an unprecedented and extraordinary opportunity to enhance the quality of life for the citizens of Shorewood".

Jaume Plensa was present at the sculpture's dedication in September 2010. He thanked Shorewood for giving one of his "children" a beautiful home, and expressed satisfaction that his artwork was placed near Lake Michigan, where it could engage in a dialogue with its site. "One can see the influences of northern Spain of Plensa's aesthetic," wrote Debra Brehmer in the Wisconsin Gazette. "Like his fellow countrymen, Salvador Dalí, Pablo Picasso, Antoni Gaudi, and Joan Miró, there is a playful humanism and a commitment to biomorphic, inventive form infused with an unabashed romanticism."

The work investigates the connection between art and nature while also referencing the letter as the original component of poetry. It has also been suggested that this paradoxical sculpture, which appears both transparent and solid, implies that "we are hollow men". Visitors to the park are often observed interacting with the sculpture, apparently feeling a connection to its human form, and enjoying how the form changes as one walks around it.

=== Acquisition ===
The acquisition of Spillover was primarily enabled by an anonymous $350,000 contribution. It was additionally supported by the Shorewood Foundation, Shorewood Men's Club, Village of Shorewood Marketing Program, and the Village of Shorewood.

== Allegations of antisemitic content ==
On November 14, 2015, the statue was temporarily removed from Atwater Park after a New Jersey blogger alleged that it contained the phrases FRY BAD JEW, DEAD JEW and CHEAP JEW.

Plensa informed the people of Shorewood that he preferred to adjust the letters to avoid any future misinterpretations of his work. The sculpture was voluntarily modified at the Richard Gray Art Gallery by Plensa's representatives, who replaced a letter "E" with the letter "B". The sculpture was then returned to Atwater Park on Saturday, January 16, 2016
