= Hudson River Waterfront Walkway =

Park in New Jersey, US

Coordinates: 40.571066°N 74.217281°W

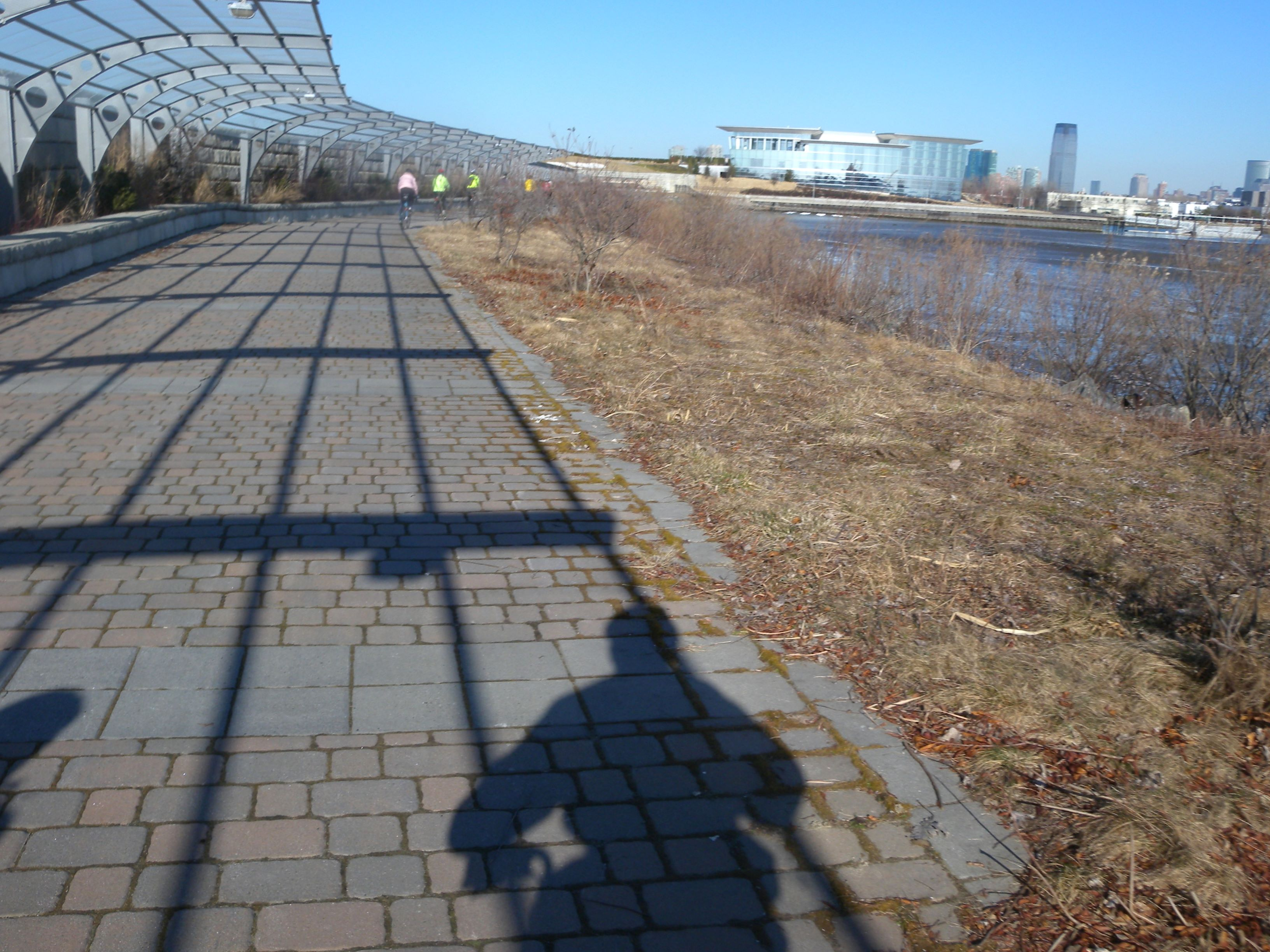
Walkway adjacent to Liberty National Golf Course

The Hudson River Waterfront Walkway, also known as the Hudson River Walkway, is a promenade along the Hudson Waterfront in New Jersey. The ongoing and incomplete project located on Kill van Kull and the western shore of Upper New York Bay and the Hudson River was implemented as part of a New Jersey state-mandated master plan to connect the municipalities from the Bayonne Bridge to the George Washington Bridge with an urban linear park and provide contiguous unhindered access to the water's edge.

There is no projected date for its completion, though large segments have been built or incorporated into it since its inception. The southern end in Bayonne may eventually connect to the Hackensack RiverWalk, another proposed walkway along Newark Bay and Hackensack River on the west side of the Hudson County peninsula, and form part of a proposed Harbor Ring around the harbor. Its northern end is in Palisades Interstate Park, allowing users to continue along the river bank and alpine paths to the New Jersey/New York state line and beyond. (A connection to the Long Path, a 330-mile (530 km) hiking trail with terminus near Albany, is feasible.)

As of 2007, eleven miles (18 km) of walkway have been completed, with an additional five miles (8.0 km) designated HRWW along Broadway in Bayonne. A part of the East Coast Greenway, or ECG, a project to create a nearly 3,000-mile (4,800 km) urban path linking the major cities along the Atlantic coast runs concurrent with the HRWW.

In 2013 the walkway showed signs of age. Some of the pilings on which it is built succumbed to marine worms and effects of Hurricane Sandy in New Jersey, which undermined bedding.

== Route ==
NASA image of the lower Hudson

The distance of the walkway from beginning to end is approximately 18.5 miles (29.8 km) as "the crow flies". It is considerably longer as it follows the contour of the shoreline.

It traverses established residential and commercial areas, re-developed piers, wetland preservation zones, industrial and transportation infrastructure, and is dotted with public and private marinas and parks. Expansive views of the water and the New York skyline can be seen from most of its length. It passes through the following municipalities, which have combined population of approximately 545,000, as of the 2010 census.

- Bayonne (63,024)
- Jersey City (247,597) The walkway here runs from Chapel Avenue through Port Liberte, past Liberty National Golf Club, and through Liberty State Park to Jersey Avenue. Another segment runs from Exchange Place through Newport to Hoboken.
- Hoboken (50,005)
- Weehawken (12,554)
- West New York (49,708)
- Guttenberg (11,176)
- North Bergen (60,773)
- Edgewater (11,513)
- Fort Lee (35,345)

== History ==
A walkway or promenade along the northeastern New Jersey waterfront was first discussed at a state level in the late 1970s. In 1988, the New Jersey Department of Environmental Protection created the Coastal Zone Management Rules, which outlined the regulations and specifications for its construction. They require anyone building within 100 feet (30 m) of the water's edge to provide a minimum of 30 feet (9.1 m) wide open, public space along the shoreline. Construction must be permitted by the agency and paid for by the developer. In 1999, the National Association of Home Builders and the New Jersey Builders Association challenged the obligation in court as an unfair taking of private property under eminent domain, saying that property owners should be compensated as specified by the "Takings clause" of the Fifth Amendment. A federal judge rejected the suit, upholding a state rule that requires property owners to provide access to the waterfront. By the end of 2019, most of the Walkway was complete. Only seven "gaps" remain to be built from Liberty State Park in Jersey City to the George Washington Bridge. Major sections of the Walkway remain unbuilt in industrial Bayonne.

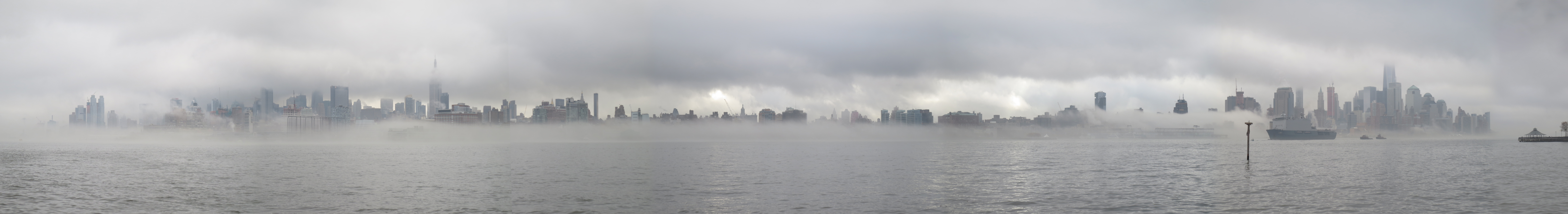
The Hudson River and Manhattan skyline, as seen from Hoboken waterfront

== Parks and points of interest ==
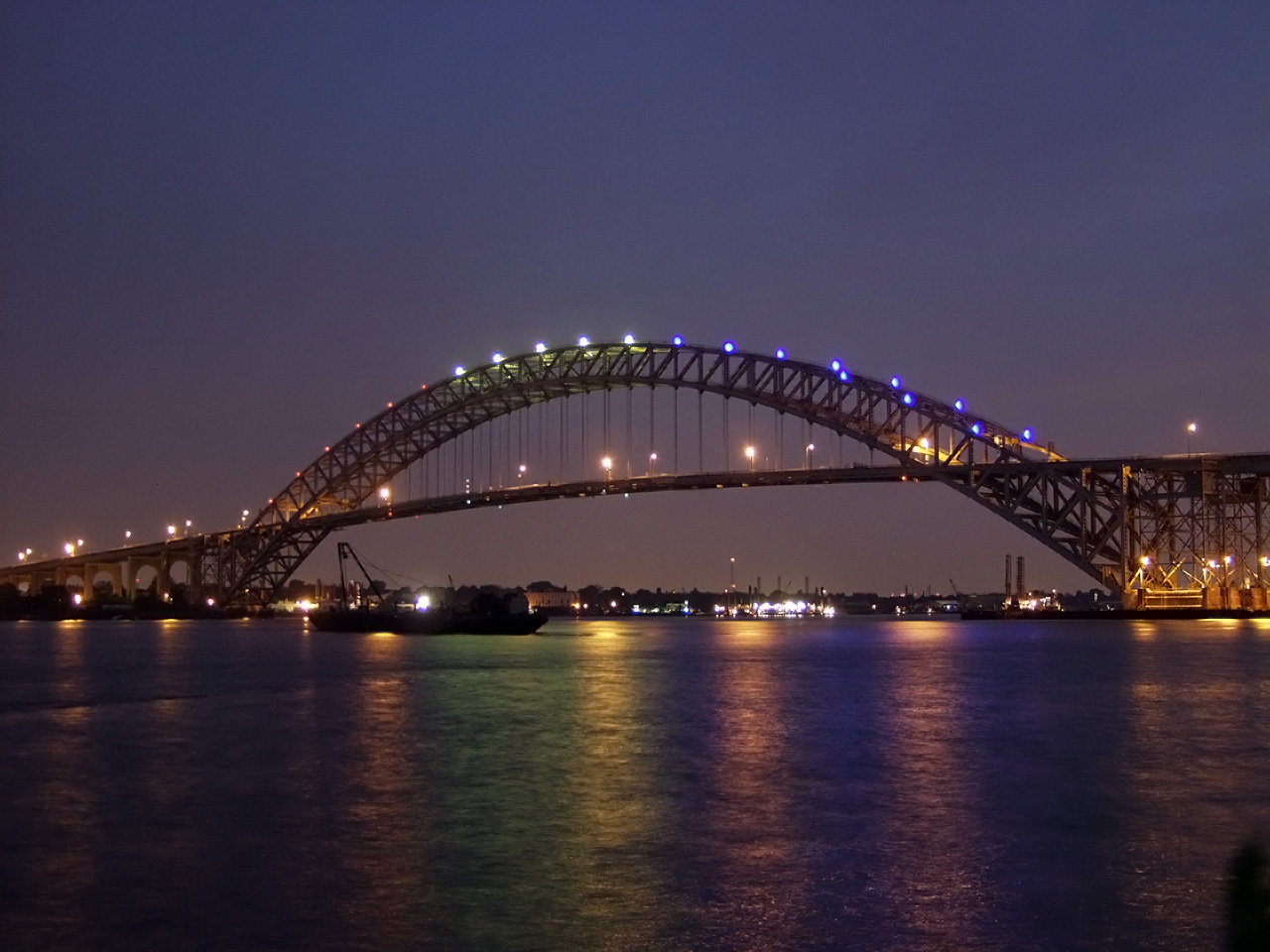
Bayonne Bridge at sunset

Plaque marking site of the Black Tom explosion

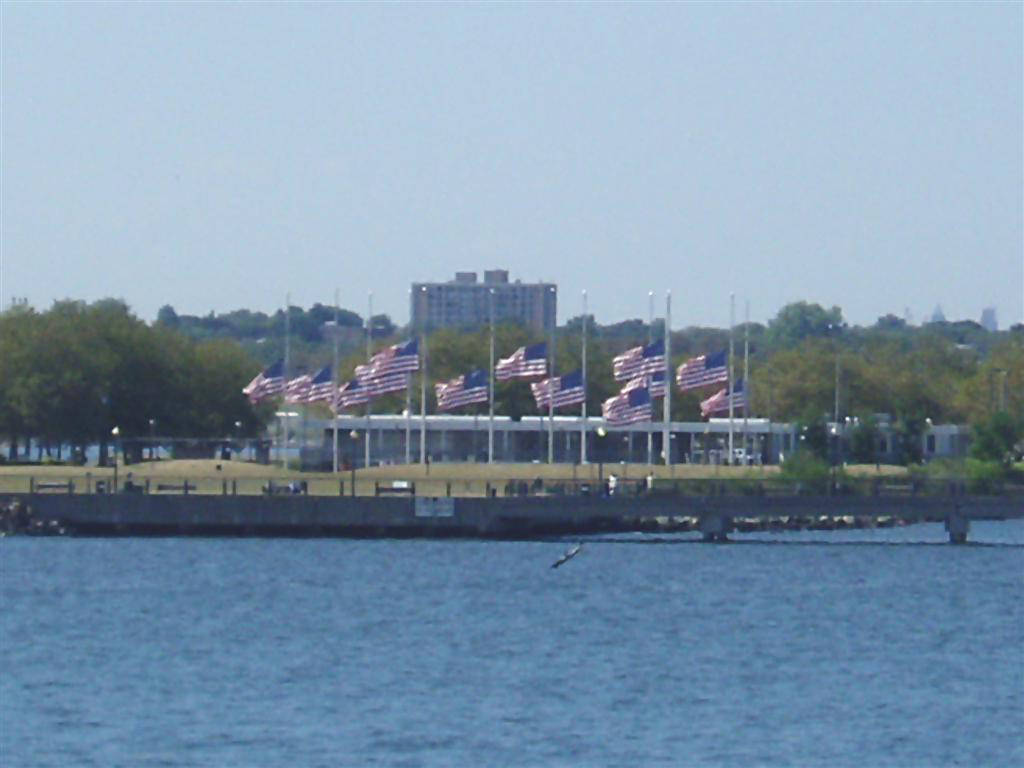
Flags at half-staff in Liberty State Park

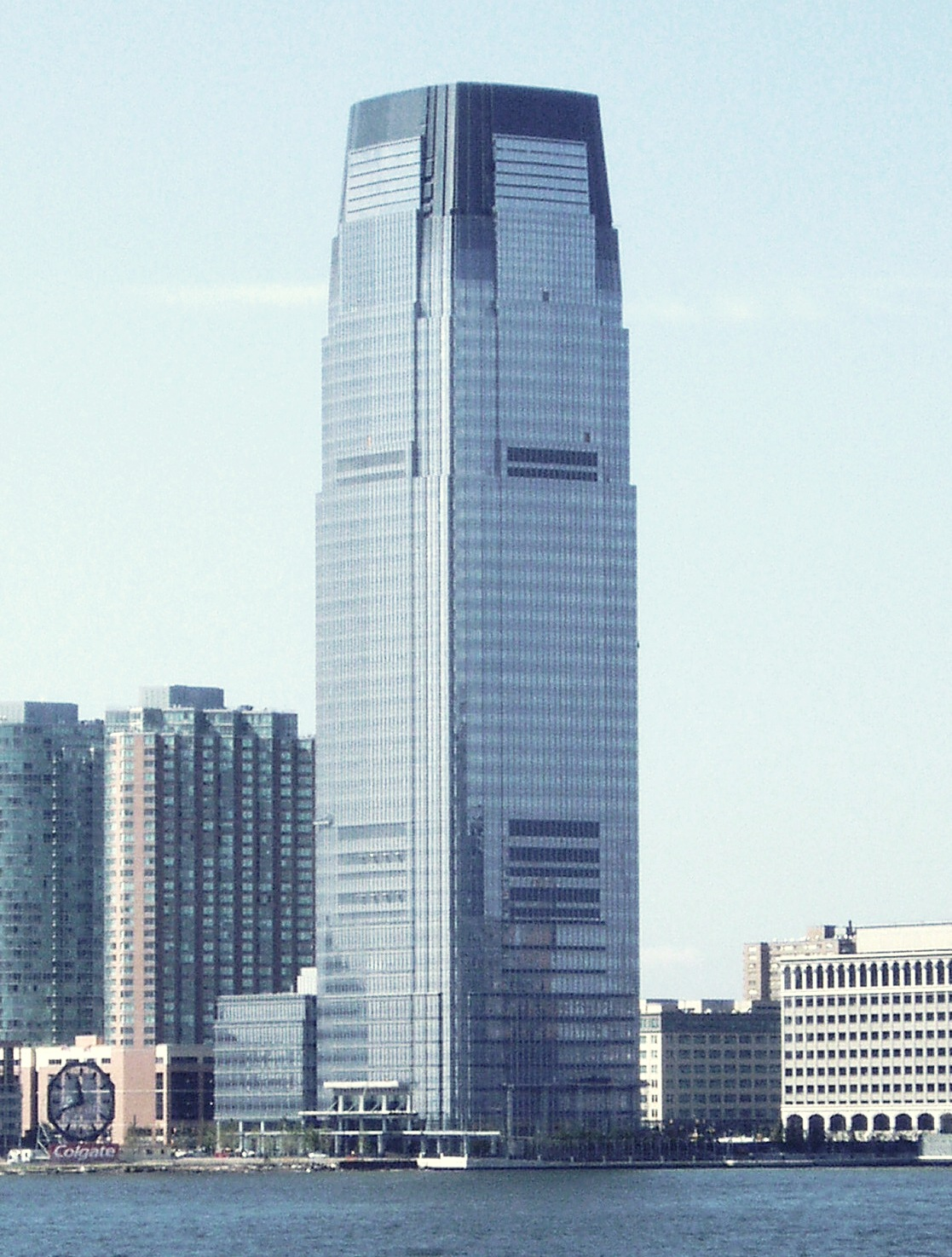
Exchange Place/Colgate Clock

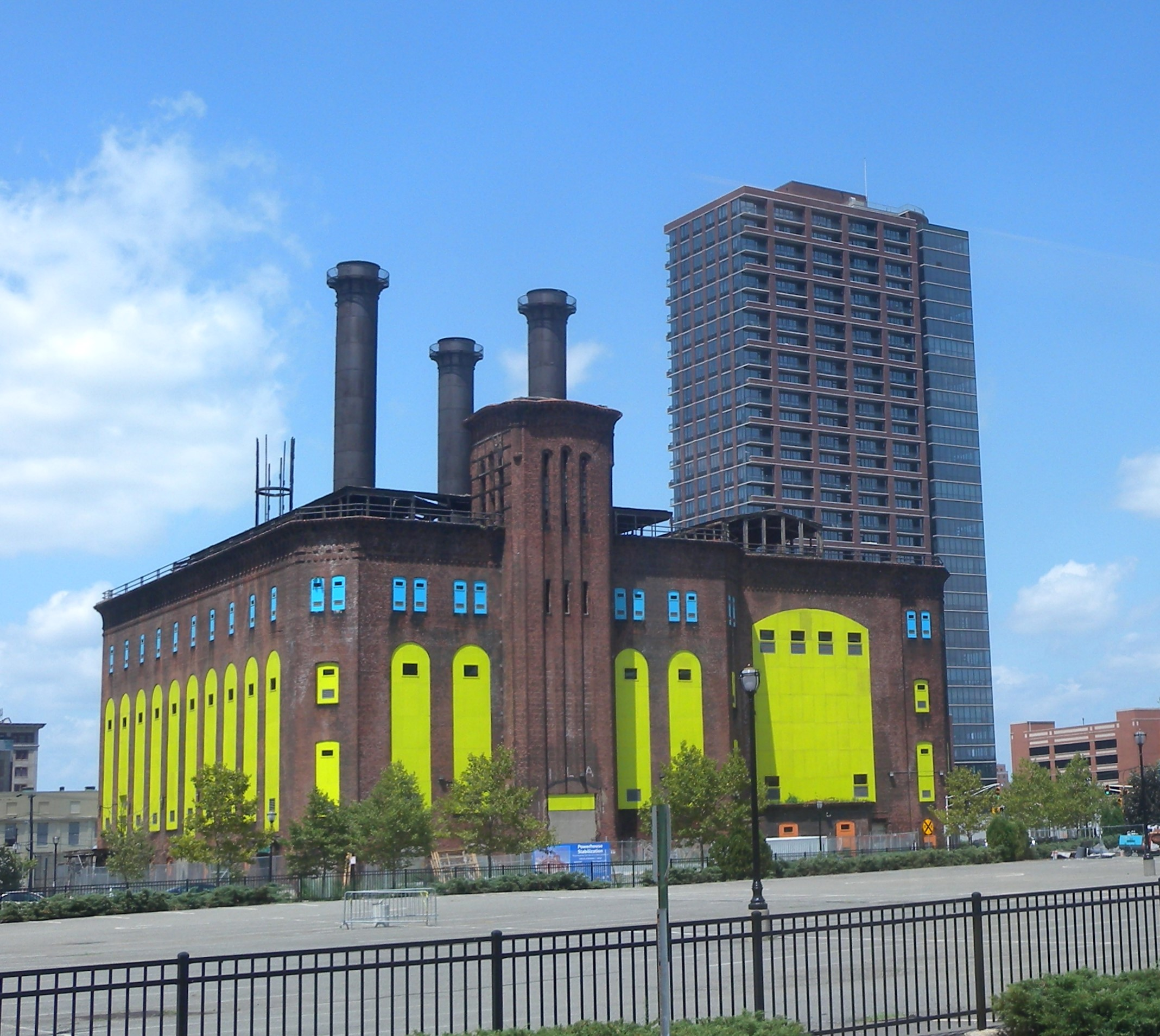
The Powerhouse

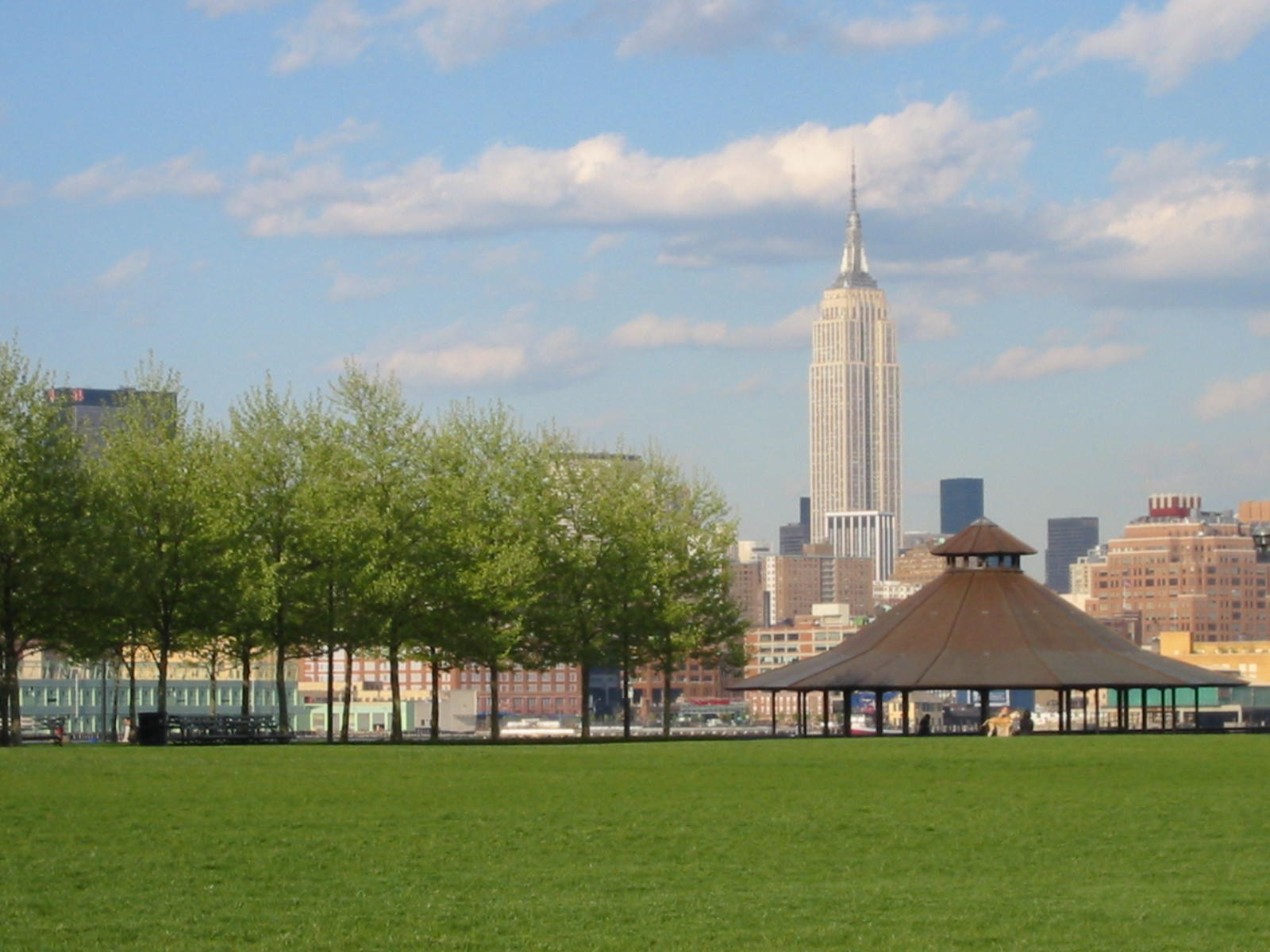
Pier A

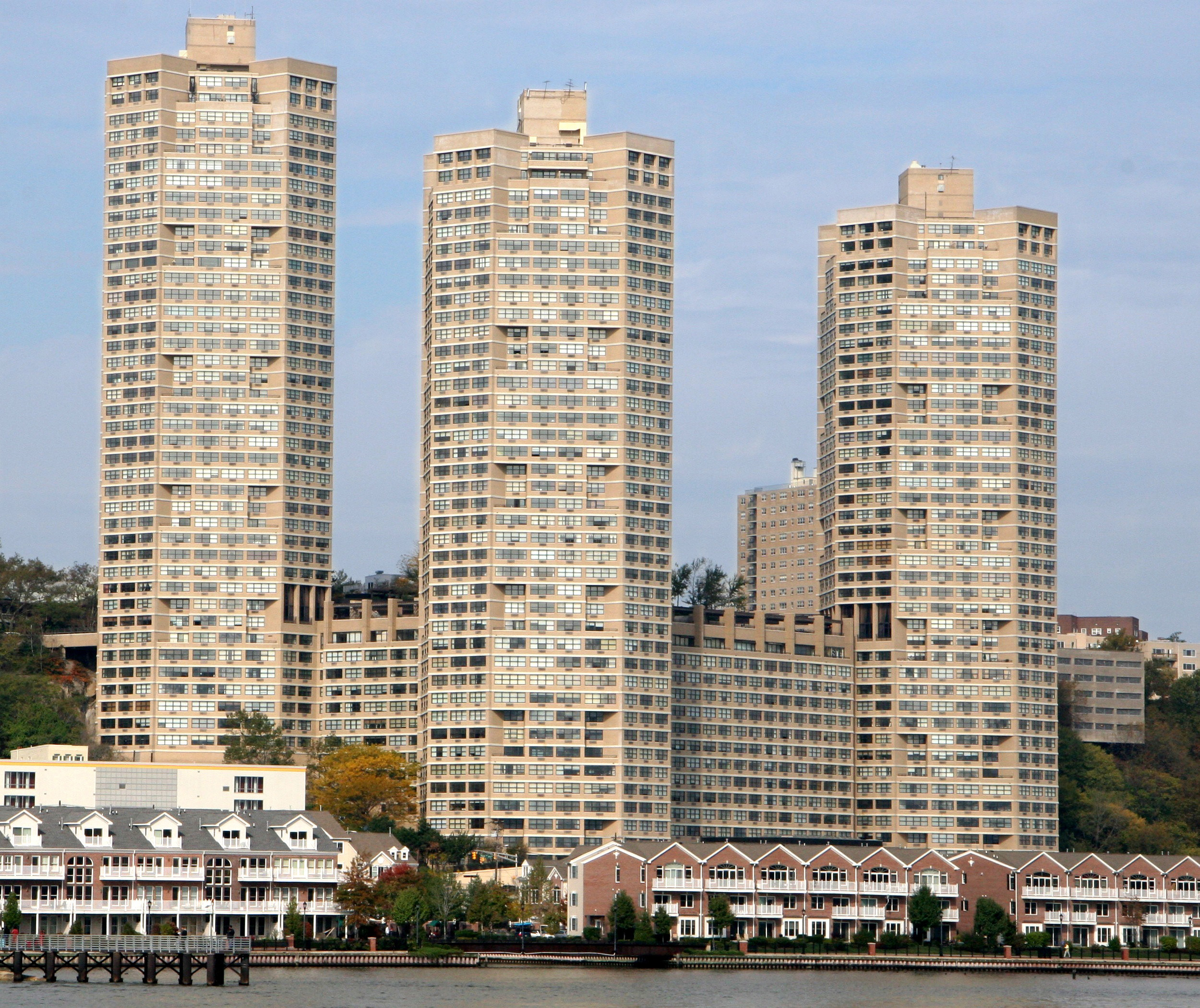
Galaxy Towers

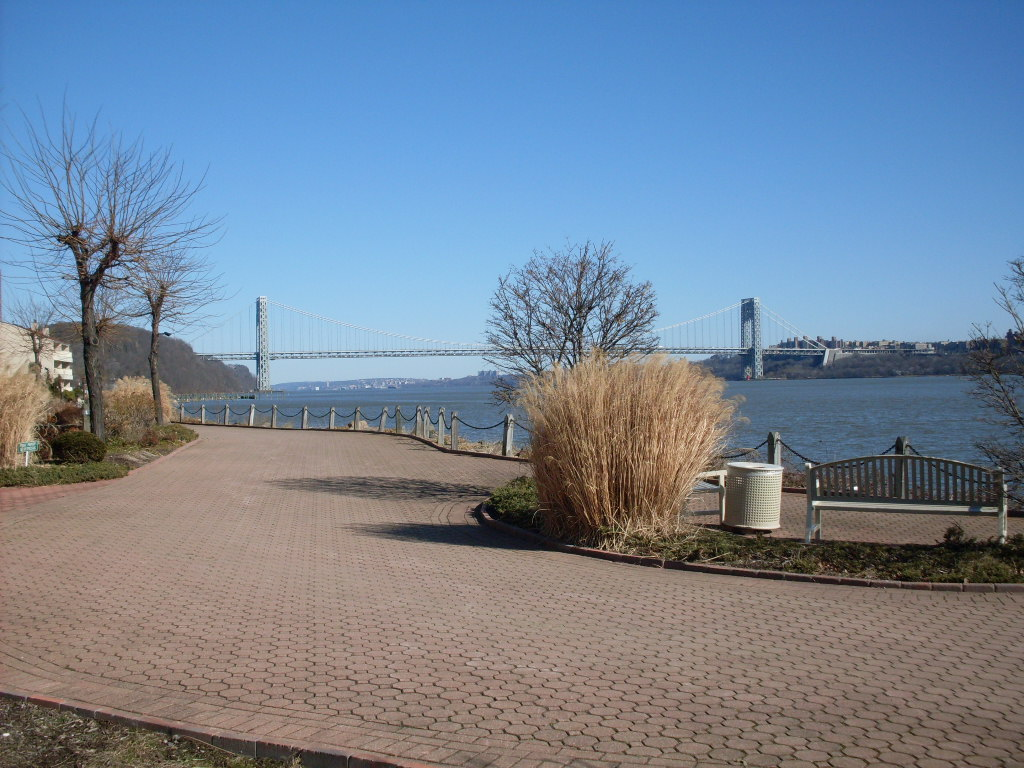
Looking north to George Washington Bridge

- Bergen Point
  - Bayonne Bridge, world's third-longest steel arch bridge
  - Collins Park
  - Bradys Dock
  - former Standard Oil Tank Cleaning Services/Texaco Tank Farm
  - Port Johnson
  - Constable Hook
  - Robbins Reef Light
  - Bayonne Golf Course - site of most extensive brownfields reclamation project in New Jersey
- The Peninsula at Bayonne Harbor, site of former Military Ocean Terminal at Bayonne
  - Tear of Grief - gift from Russia commemorating September 11, 2001
  - Cape Liberty Cruise Port
- Port Jersey
  - Waterfront Observation Tower and bird sanctuary for endangered least tern
  - Greenville Yards
  - Liberty National Golf Course-southern section
- Caven Point
  - Caven Athletic Complex
  - US Army Corps of Engineers station
  - Port Liberte
  - Liberty State Park-Caven Point Branch
  - US Army Reserve Center
  - Liberty National Golf Course-main section
- Liberty State Park
  - Black Tom, site of World War I sabotage explosion
  - Central Railroad of New Jersey Terminal
  - Hornblower Cruises ferry to Ellis Island and Liberty Island
  - Liberty Science Center
  - Morris Canal Big Basin
- Paulus Hook
  - Liberty State Park-Peninsula Park
  - Morris Canal-Little Basin
  - Colgate Clock, with claims to being the world's largest
  - Goldman Sachs Tower, 2nd tallest building in New Jersey.
  - Exchange Place, downtown Jersey City's "financial" district
  - Katyń Memorial
- Pavonia
  - Hudson and Manhattan Railroad Powerhouse
  - Harsimus Cove site one of early European settlements
  - Pavonia/Newport, site of Erie Railroad's Pavonia Terminal (1861–1958)
  - Holland Tunnel Ventilation Tower, with twin across river
    - Water's Soul (2021) sculpture
  - 13 panel exhibition of history of environment, development of lower Hudson River
  - Long Slip
- Hoboken
  - Hoboken Terminal, 1908 national landmark and major transportation hub
  - Pier A
  - Marineview Plaza, urban renewal project in the Brutalist style
  - Stevens Institute of Technology
  - Castle Point, serpentine rock bluff
  - Sybil's Cave, long-abandoned site of spring and inspiration for Edgar Allan Poe's "The Mystery of Marie Roget"
  - Elysian Park
  - Maxwell Place i previous home of Maxwell House coffee
  - Hudson Tea Building, massive former Lipton Tea plant
- Weehawken
  - Weehawken Cove, where Henry Hudson's Half Moon anchored in 1609
  - Lincoln Harbor
  - Riva Point
  - The Atrium, home to events sponsored by the proposed Hudson River Performing Arts Center
  - King's Bluff, at the foot of which the Burr–Hamilton duel took place in 1804
  - Lincoln Tunnel Ventilation Towers
  - Weehawken park and Municipal Athletic Fields
  - Hudson Riverfront 9/11 Memorial
  - West Shore Railroad Tunnel, used by Hudson-Bergen Light Rail
  - Weehawken Port Imperial
- Guttenberg
  - Galaxy Towers, a trio of octagonal highrises built in the late 1970s
  - Palisades Medical Center (North Bergen)
- Edgewater
  - Edgewater Harbor
  - Municipal Building
  - Edgewater Cemetery, with 19th and 20th century graves
  - Previous site of the Binghamton, decommissioned ferry and registered national historic place
  - Mitsuwa Marketplace
  - Old Municipal Building now a museum
  - Edgewater Landing
  - Veterans Park/Edgewater Community Center-site of plaque commemorating Vriessendael, the first European settlement in what would become contemporary Bergen County
  - Edgewater Colony
- Palisades Interstate Park
  - Mt. Constitution, atop which sits Fort Lee Historic Park, site of George Washington's 1776 encampment Fort Constitution
  - George Washington Bridge

== See also ==
- Brooklyn Bridge Park
- East River Greenway
- Hudson River Park
- Hudson Waterfront
- Manhattan Waterfront Greenway
- Riverside Park (Manhattan)
- Water's Soul (2021) sculpture
