= LeFrak =

LeFrak is a surname. Notable people with the surname include:

- Richard LeFrak (born 1945), American real estate tycoon, son of Samuel
- Samuel J. LeFrak (1918–2003), American real estate tycoon

== See also ==
- LeFrak City
- LeFrak-Moelis Records
