= Dreaming (sculpture) =

Sculpture in Toronto, Ontario, Canada

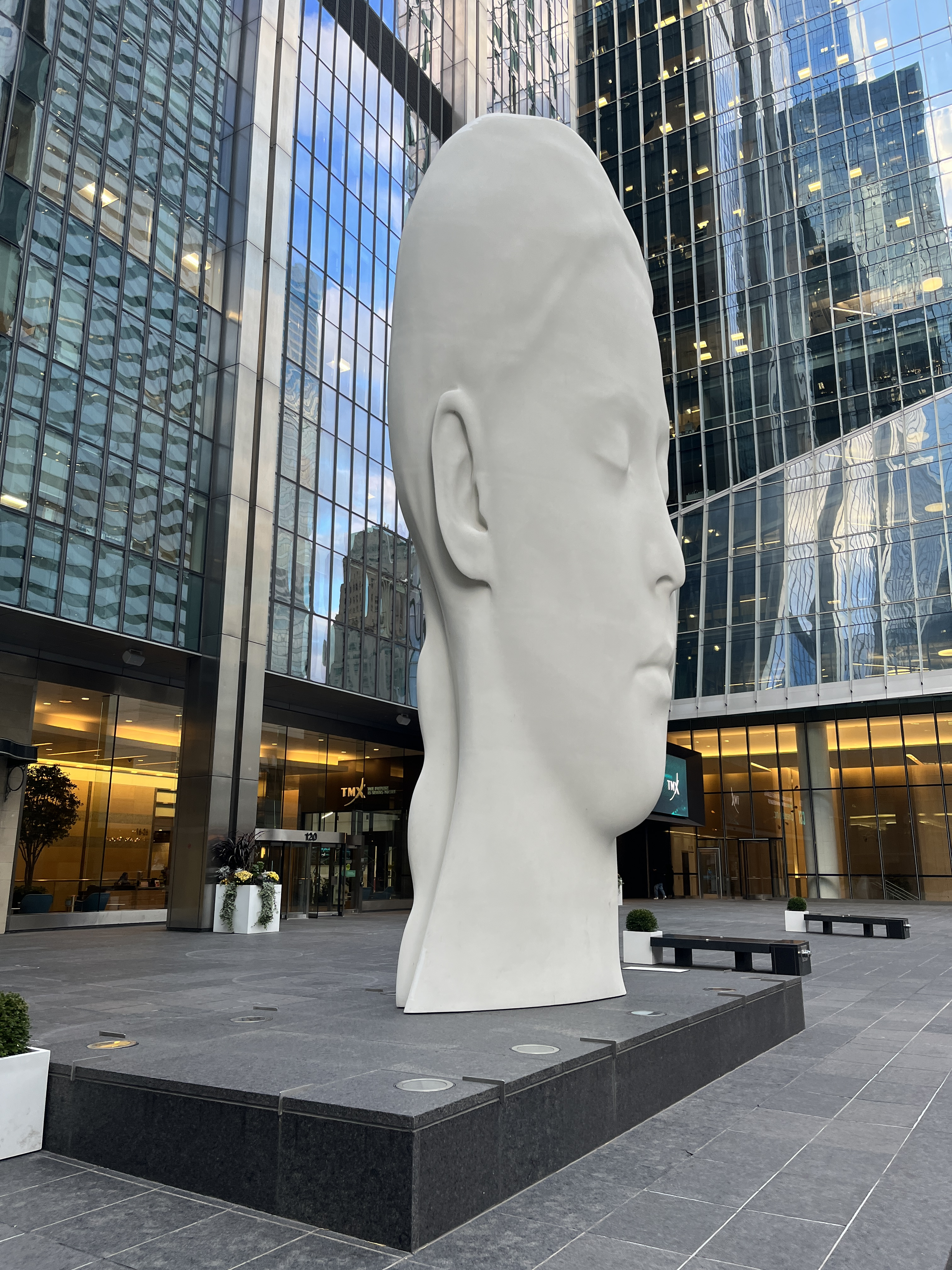
- The sculpture in 2023
- Artist: Jaume Plensa
- Year: 2020
- Location: Toronto, Ontario, Canada; 43°38′58.5″N 79°22′59.6″W

Dreaming is an 8.5 metre tall, 2.5-tonne sculpture by Jaume Plensa, colloquially known as "Lucia". It was installed in Toronto, Ontario, Canada, in 2020.

== Description ==
The sculpture depicts the elongated face of a young woman with her eyes closed in a meditative expression. It stands 8.5 metres tall and is cast from polyester resin mixed with marble dust, giving the work a smooth, white finish. The simplified form and vertical compression are characteristic of Plensa’s large portrait heads, which are designed to evoke introspection and calm. When viewed from different angles, the proportions create a subtle optical effect that alters the viewer’s perception of depth.

== Commission and installation ==
The piece was commissioned by Oxford Properties as part of the redevelopment of the Richmond-Adelaide Centre and installed in October 2020. The sculpture sits in a public plaza overlooking Adelaide Street West and serves as a focal point within Toronto’s Financial District.

== Public reception ==
Local and national media described the sculpture as one of Toronto’s most striking additions to the downtown landscape. Coverage in CBC News and BlogTO noted how the large white face contrasts with the surrounding glass towers and offers a moment of quiet amid the city’s bustle.

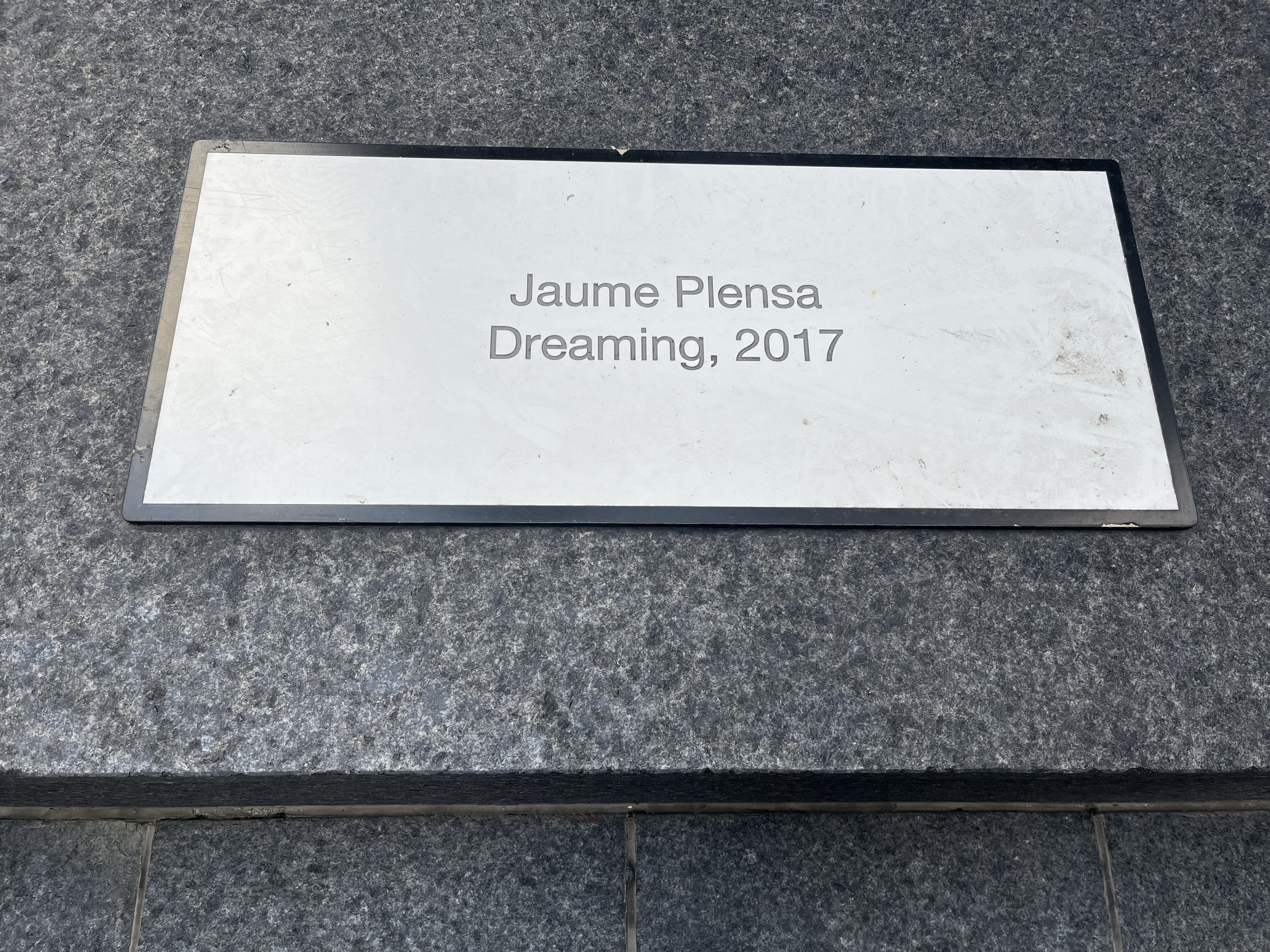
Plaque
