= Newport, Jersey City =

Populated place in Hudson County, New Jersey, US

Coordinates: 40.729698°N 74.036350°W

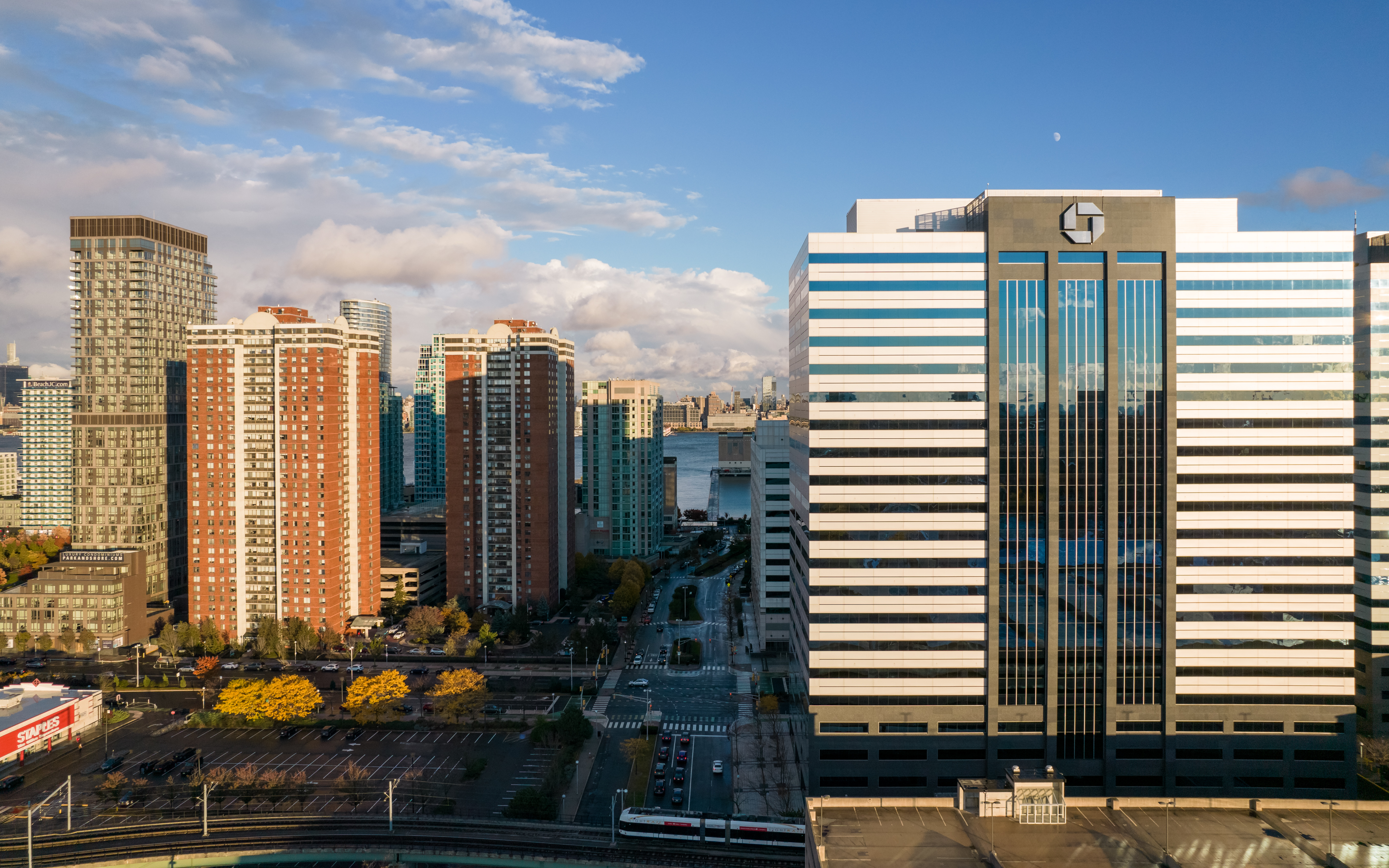
High-rises in Newport, showing a mix of residential and commercial buildings.

Newport is a 600-acre (2.4 km^{2}) master-planned, mixed-use community in Downtown Jersey City, in the U.S. state of New Jersey, consisting of retail, residential, office, and entertainment facilities. The neighborhood is situated on the Hudson Waterfront. Prior to development, the area was home to the Erie Railroad's Pavonia Terminal. The area is located opposite Lower Manhattan and the Tribeca neighborhood in New York City. Redevelopment of Newport began in 1986 as a $10 billion project led by real-estate tycoon Samuel J. LeFrak and his firm The LeFrak Organization.

== History ==
Newport's name was changed from "Newport City" to just "Newport" in 1988.

== Transportation ==
New Jersey Transit's Hudson-Bergen Light Rail's Newport station and Port Authority Trans-Hudson's ("PATH") Newport station are located in Newport. The area is also served by several New Jersey Transit bus lines, as well as other private bus lines. Interstate 78 is nearby and connects to the Holland Tunnel, which provides vehicle access to Lower Manhattan, as well as to the New Jersey Turnpike.

== Land use ==
=== Retail shopping and dining ===
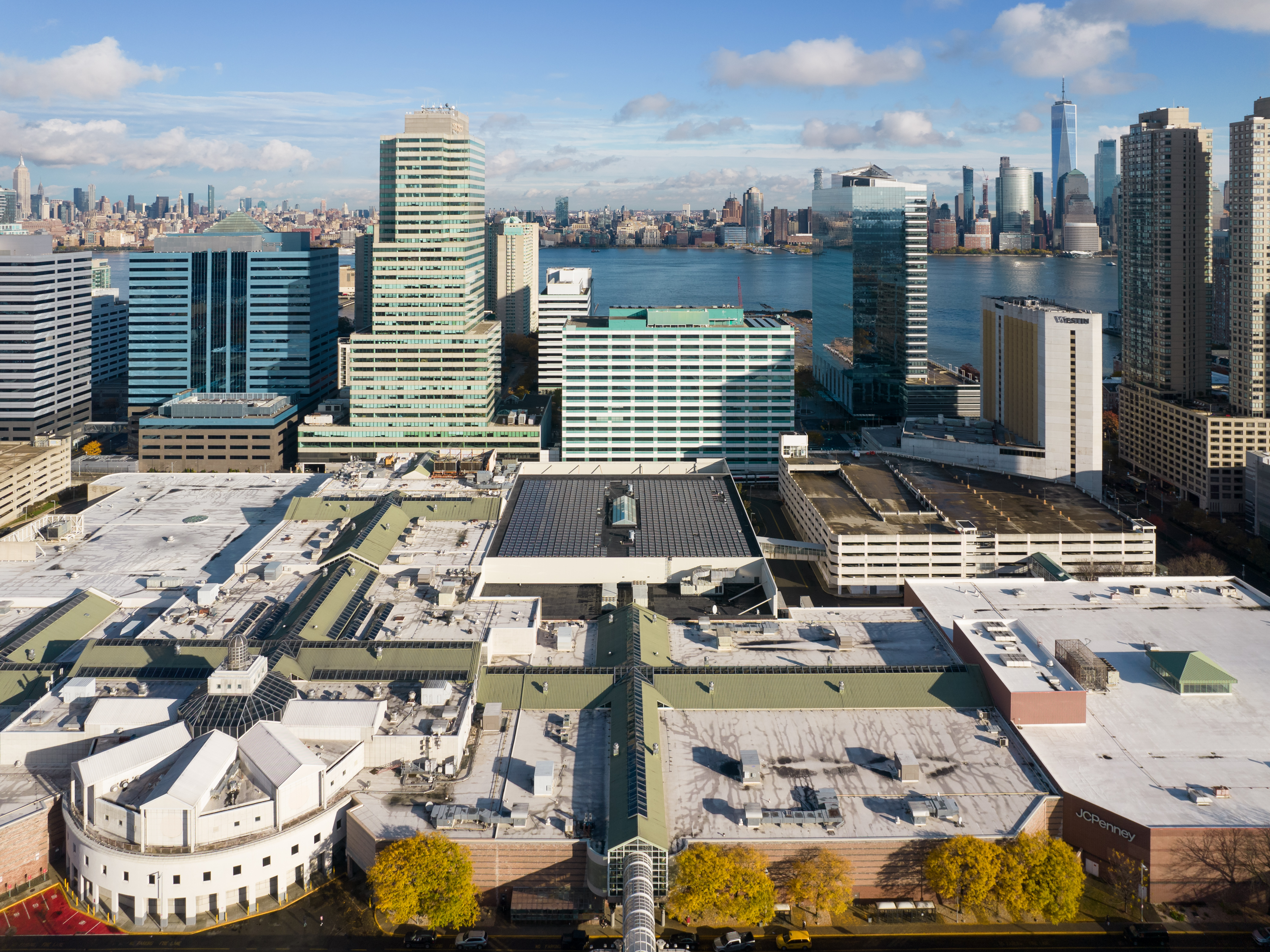
Aerial view of the Newport Centre Mall

Part of the Newport community is the Newport Centre Mall, a large traditional indoor shopping complex anchored by Macy's, JCPenney, Kohl's, H&M, Dick's Sporting Goods, and ZARA. Outside the mall and around the Newport area are a variety of primarily neighborhood oriented restaurants (known collectively as "The Restaurants at Newport") and retail stores (known collectively as "The Newport River Market"). This includes a number of notables such as a Target store which opened in 2004, and Best Buy.

=== Housing ===
As of 2014, the population of Newport is 15,000. Newport's approved master Redevelopment Plan contains an 'as-of-right' entitlement to build 9,000 units of residential housing. Newport currently includes 10 high-rise rental apartment buildings comprising approximately 4,000 households. Construction of these buildings began in 1985. Newport's 10th rental apartment building, "The Aquablu," was completed and occupied in 2009. Newport also includes 3 high-rise condominium apartment buildings comprising approximately 900 additional households. Construction of these condominium buildings began in 1987. The most recent condominium building, known as "The Shore Condominiums at Newport, North Tower" was completed in 2008. Several adjacent residential buildings just south of Thomas Gangemi Drive along the 10th Street embankment are outside of the Newport Redevelopment Zone, but because they are developed by the LeFrak organization, are often advertised by real estate professionals as being in Newport.

The residential buildings within Newport are:

- John Adams
- George Washington
- James Madison
- Thomas Jefferson
- James Monroe (condo)
- Riverside
- Atlantic
- East Hampton

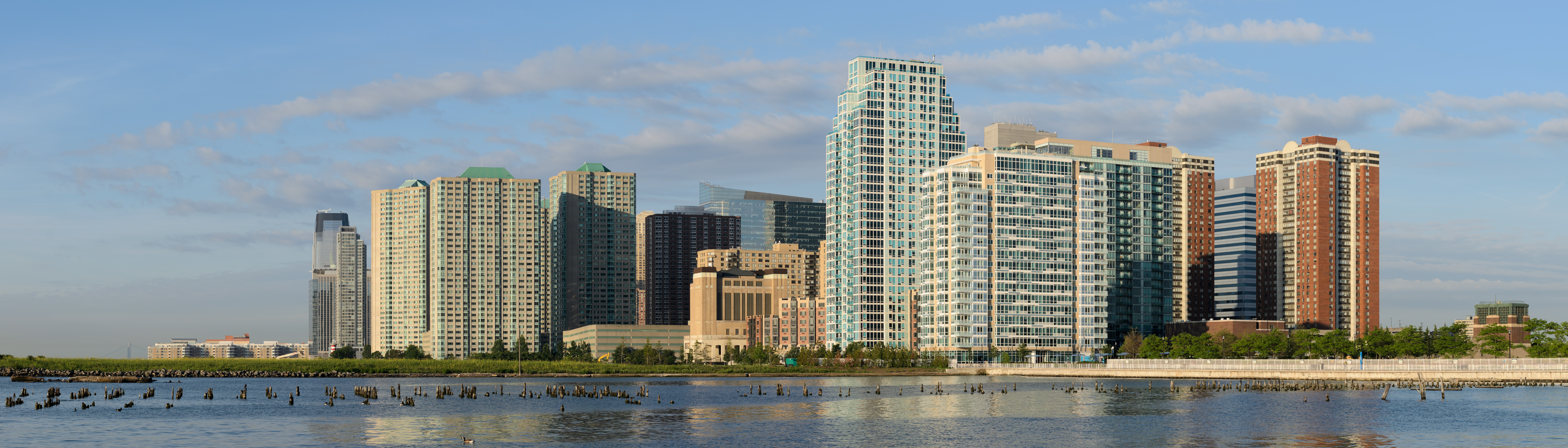
View of Newport from Hoboken (2015)

- South Hampton
- Pacific
- Parkside East
- Parkside West
- Shore Condominiums, North and South Towers
- Aquablu
- Laguna
- Ellipse
- The Beach
- Bisby at Newport

Many buildings offer views of the Hudson River and the New York City skyline. A portion of the Hudson River Waterfront Walkway runs through Newport.

=== Hotels ===
Newport's approved master Redevelopment Plan contains an 'as-of-right' entitlement to build 1,200 hotel rooms. A 187-room hotel known as the Courtyard by Marriott Jersey City-Newport opened south of Newport in 2000. A 429-room full-service hotel known as the Westin Newport, Jersey City opened in 2009.

=== Office buildings ===
The "Newport Office Center" consists of 8 buildings which in total amount to over 5,000,000 square feet (460,000 m^{2}) of Class A commercial office space. The first of these buildings, 111 Town Square Place, was built from the remnants of an abandoned warehouse in 1989. It contains both office and data centers. The most recent building, 100 Town Square Place was completed in 2003. Hundreds of different companies have headquarters or back-offices at Newport. These range from transportation companies such as EVA Air to major financial institutions. The neighborhood’s office towers provide more than six million square feet of office space to major employers including JP Morgan Chase, Citigroup, Fidelity Investments, L’Oreal, Forbes, and Tory Burch. Furthermore, it houses more than 25,000 employees. In March 2019, the LeFrak Organization sold the 350,000 square foot office tower, 570 Washington Boulevard, for $170 million.

== Newport 10,000 ==
The Newport 10,000, more popularly known as the Newport 10k, is a 10 kilometer road race (running) in the vicinity of the Hudson River Waterfront Walkway. Typically held the second weekend in May, the race tends to attract a strong regional and international field of elite runners. The course is USATF certified and consists of flat local roads.

== Gallery ==
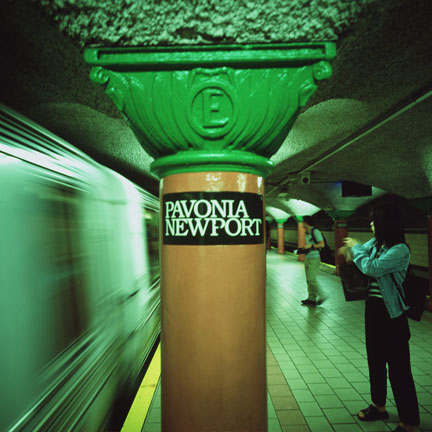
Newport PATH station

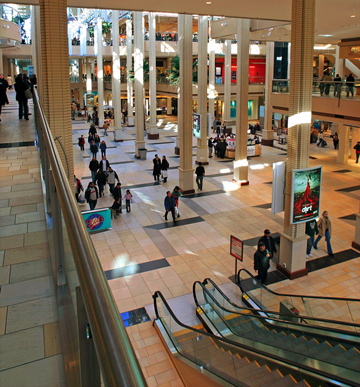
Newport Centre Mall

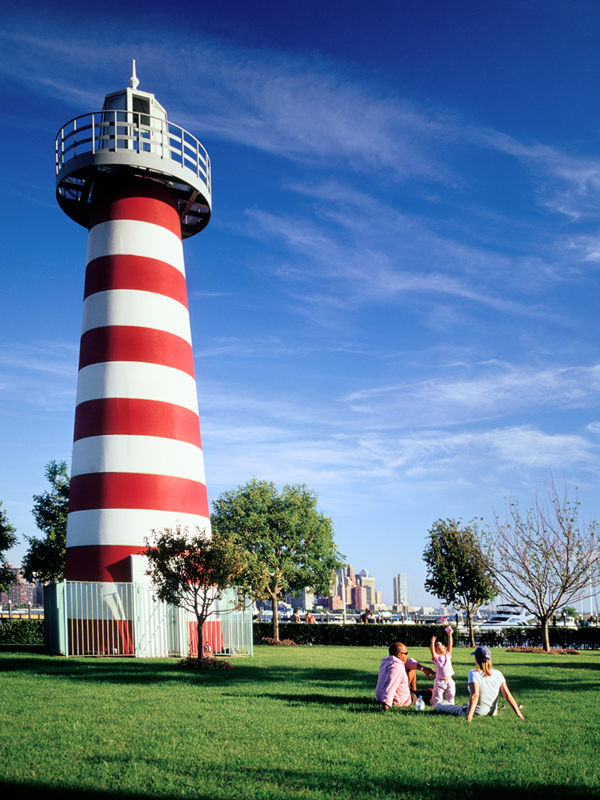
"LeFrak Lighthouse"
