= Ocean Financial Centre =

Office skyscraper in Singapore

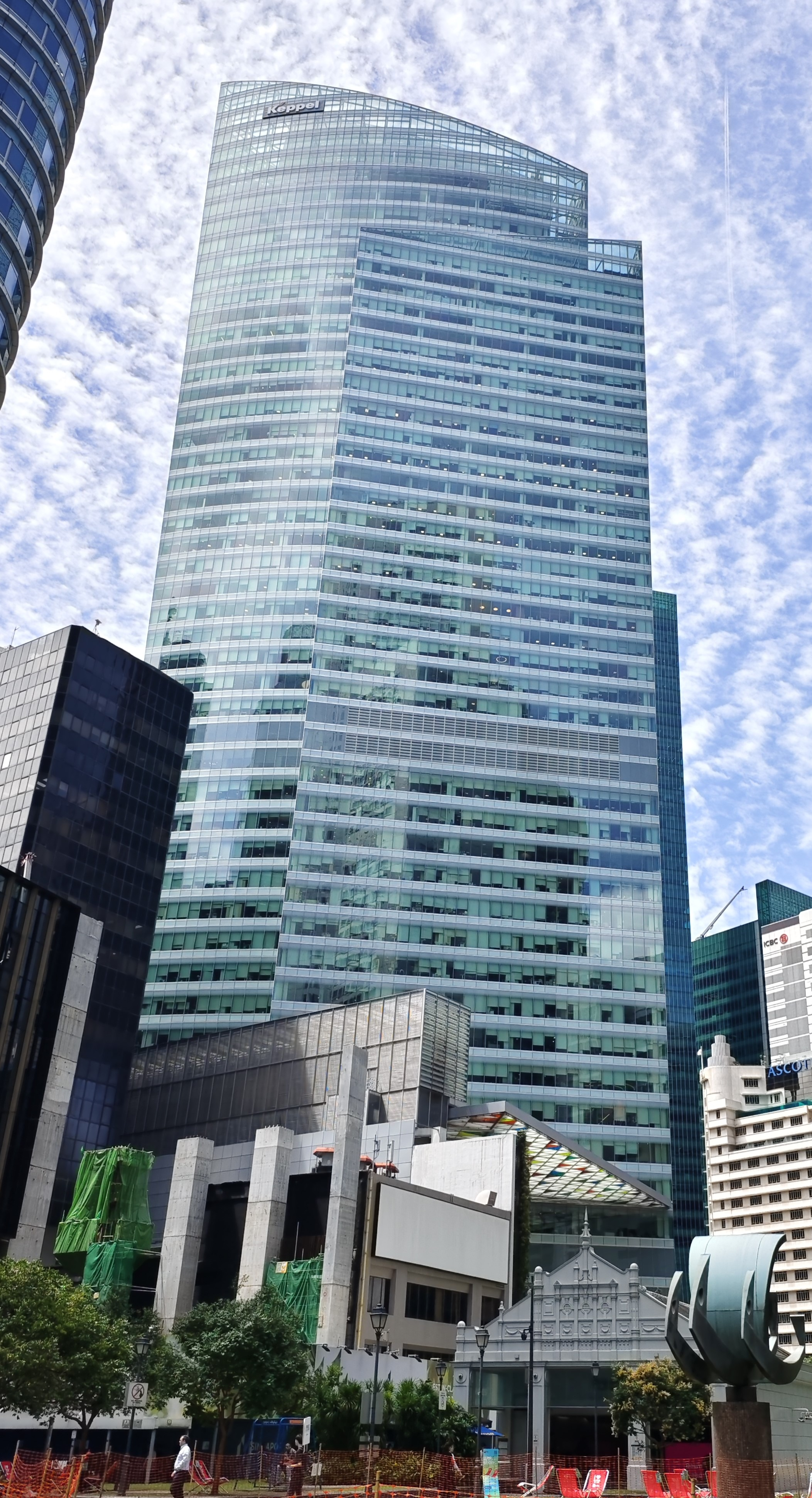
- Ocean Financial Centre in September 2025
- Interactive map of the Ocean Financial Centre area

General information
- Status: Completed
- Type: Office
- Architectural style: High-rise
- Location: 10 Collyer Quay, Singapore 049315
- Coordinates: 1°17′6.34″N 103°51′8.3″E
- Owner: K-REIT Asia

Height
- Roof: 245 metres (804 ft)

Technical details
- Floor count: 43

Design and construction
- Architect: Pelli Clarke Pelli Architects
- Developer: Keppel Land International Limited
- Main contractor: Obayashi Corporation

Website
- http://www.kepcorp.com

The Ocean Financial Centre is an office building located at Collyer Quay in the Raffles Place region of Downtown Core planning area, Singapore. It is built on the site of the former Ocean Building, which has been demolished. The new building retained the name and many of the tenants of the former office block, and will serve primarily as a home to financial corporations.

The building features a large solar array and is located next to Raffles Place MRT station.

On 17 October 2011, K-REIT Asia acquired the building from Keppel Land for more than S$2 billion.

Ocean Financial Centre used to house the Honorary Consulate of Cyprus on the 37th floor of the building.

== Gallery ==
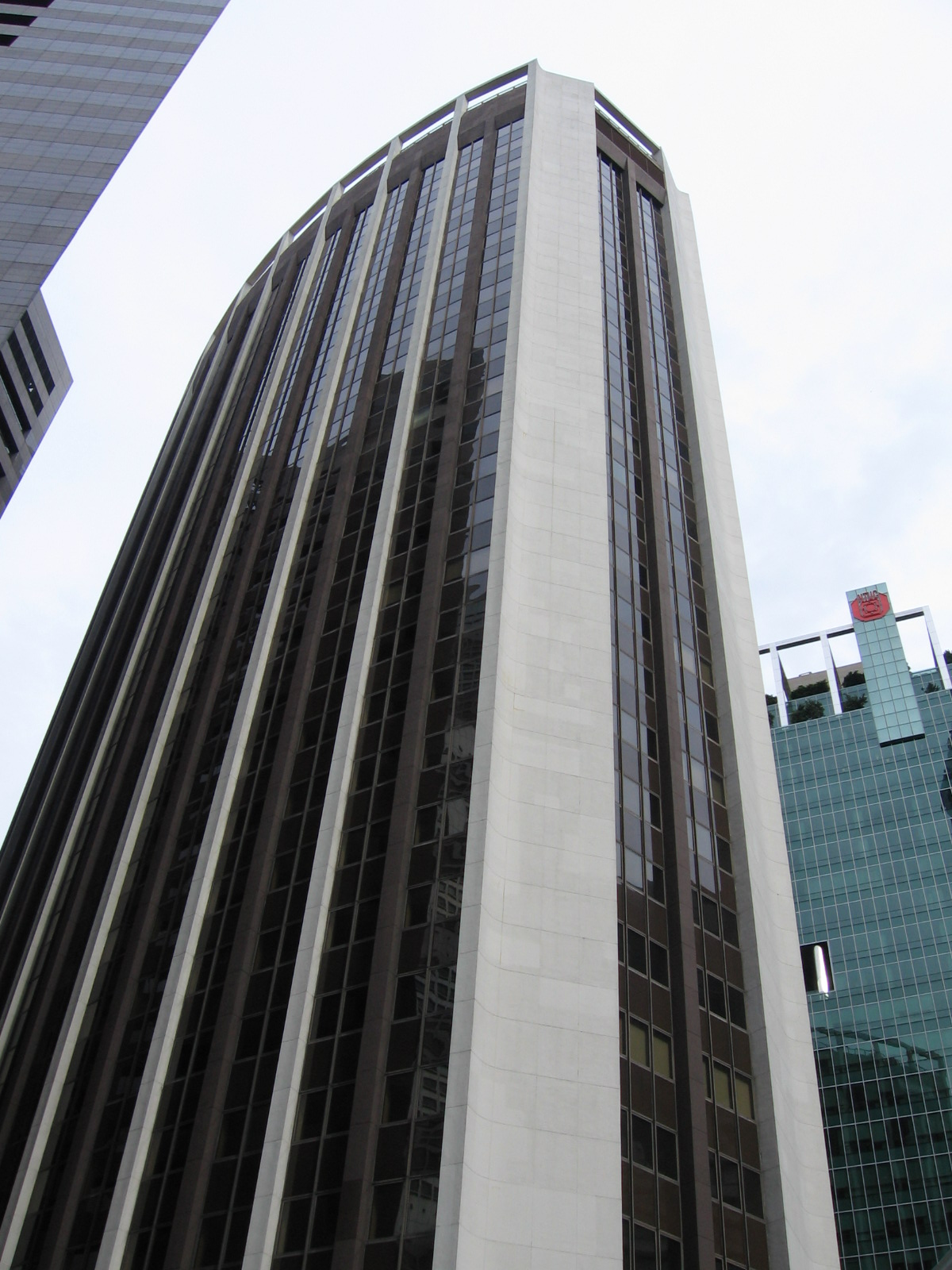
Ocean Building (taken in December 2005)

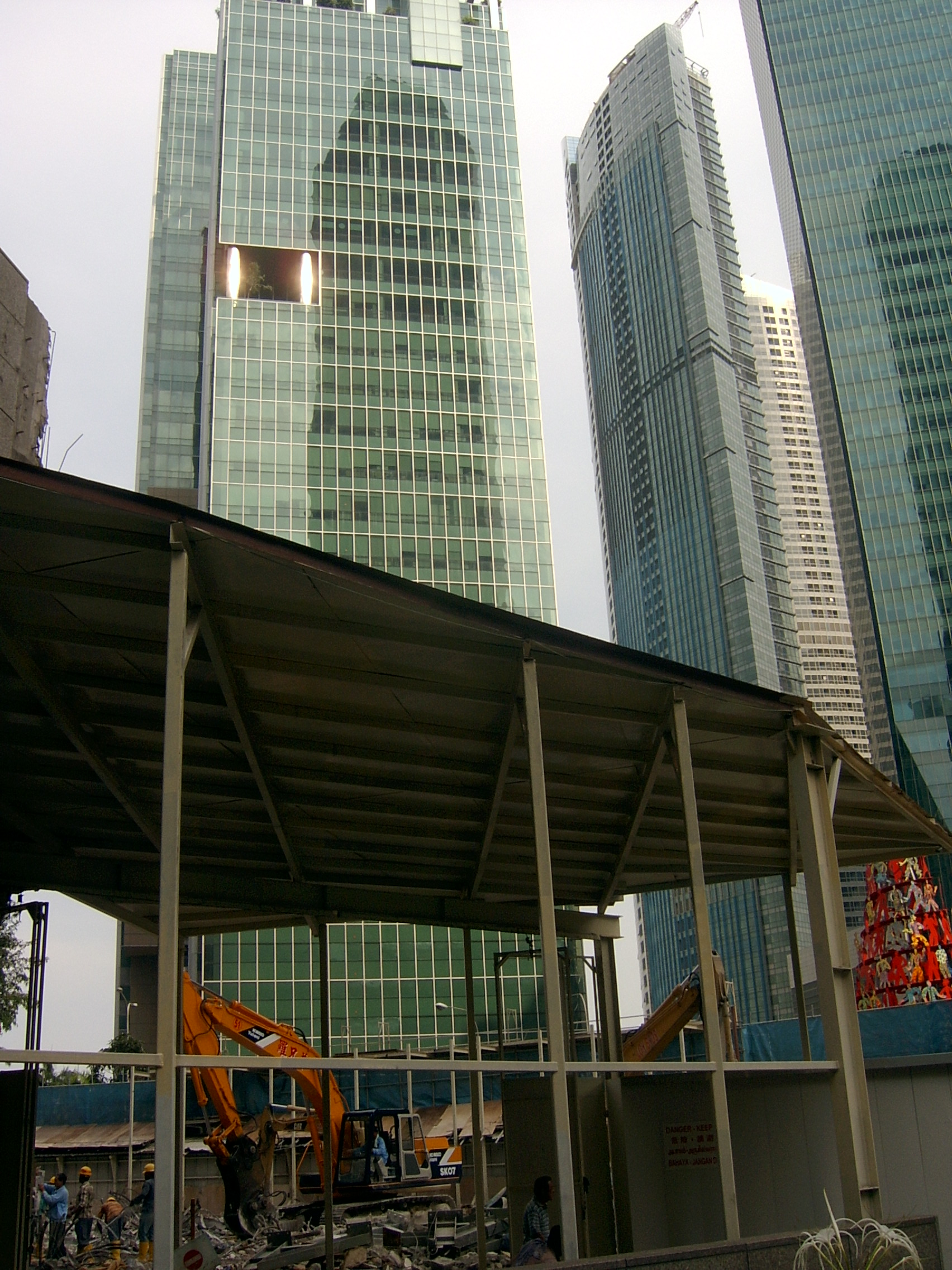
Demolition of the old building. The Sail@Marina Bay can be seen in the background.

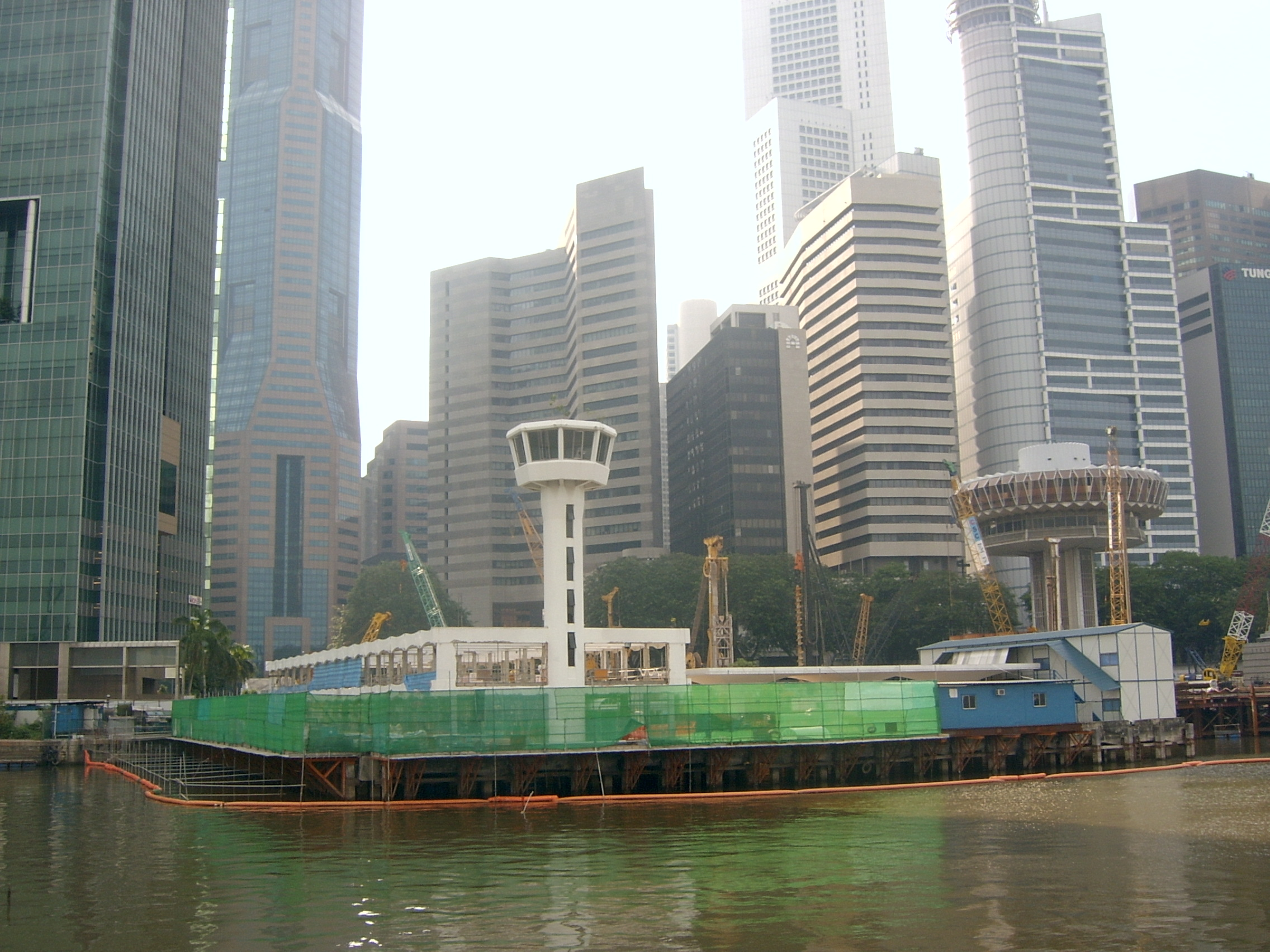
Behind the Customs House in the foreground is Ocean Towers. Ocean Financial Centre now occupies the vacant plot to the left of Ocean Towers, in front of Republic Plaza.

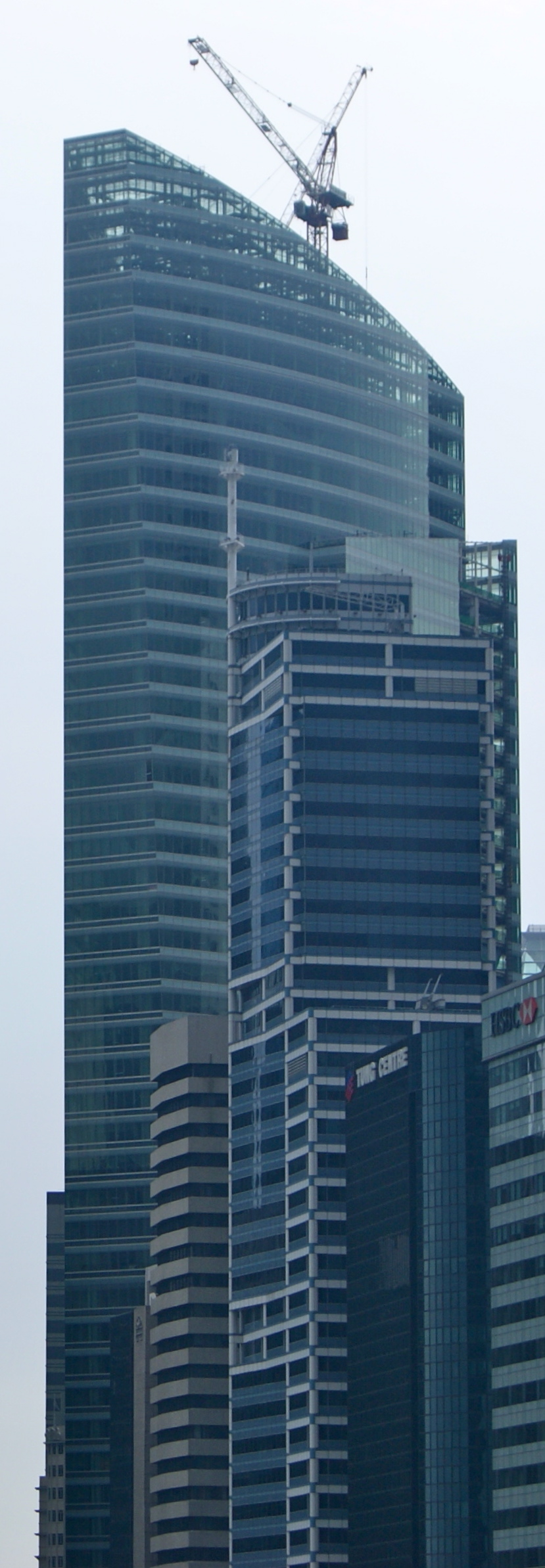
The topping out of the new building on 24 November 2010

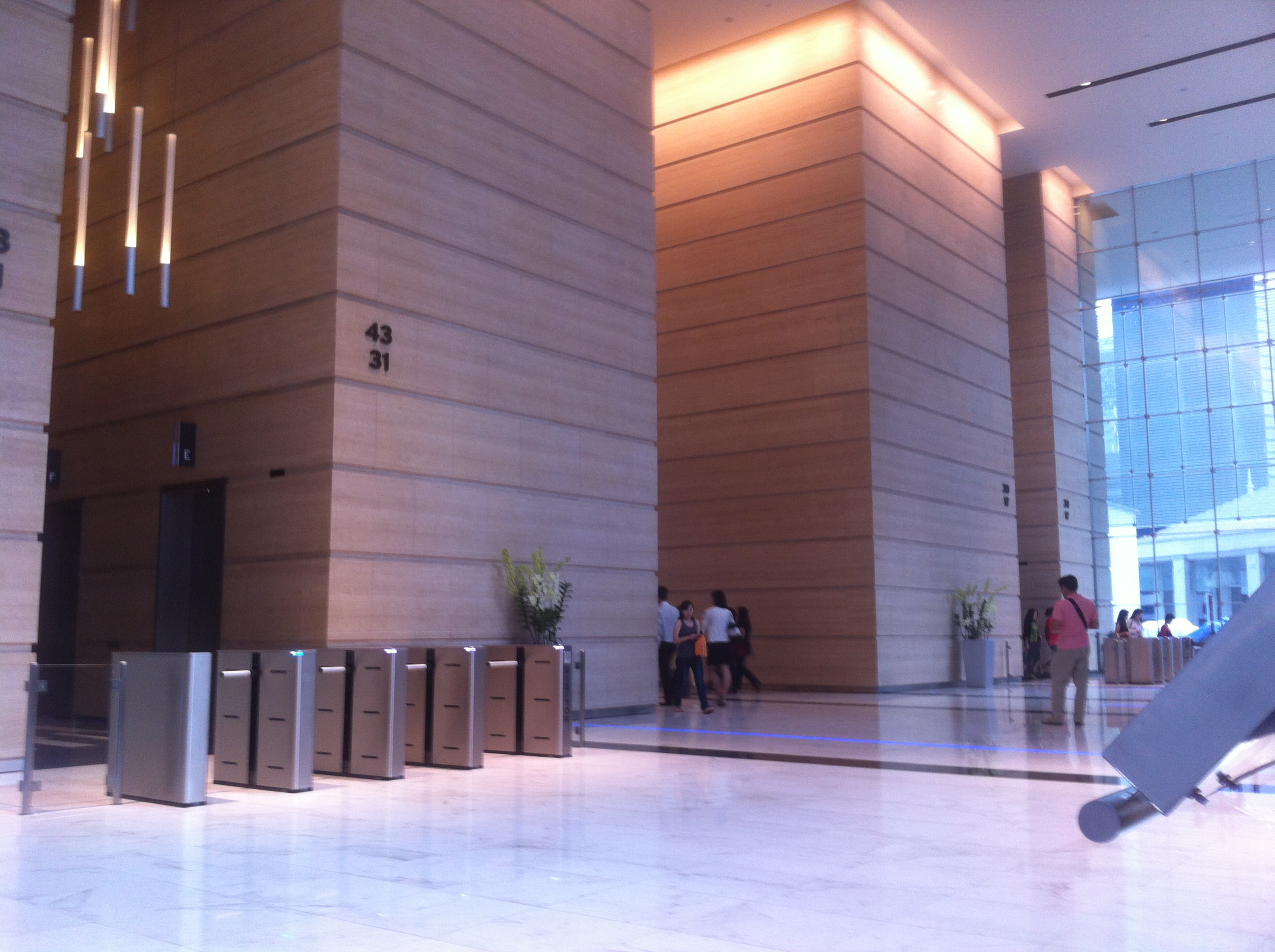
The lobby of the completed building

== See also ==
- List of tallest buildings in Singapore
- List of buildings
