= Boeing Galleries =

Coordinates: 41°52′57.75″N 87°37′21.60″W

- Jaume Plensa's Looking Into My Dreams, Awilda during Millennium Park's 10th anniversary installation at Boeing Galleries
- Established: June 2005
- Location: Millennium Park; Chicago, Illinois; United States
- Type: open-air gallery
- Public transit access: Millennium Station - Metra; Monroe/State (CTA) - Red Line; Randolph/Wabash (CTA) -Brown, Purple, Green, Orange, and Pink; Monroe/Dearborn (CTA) - Blue Line
- Website: http://www.millenniumpark.org/parkevents/ (June 2008 archived version found here)

Boeing Galleries (North Boeing Gallery and South Boeing Gallery) are a pair of outdoor exhibition spaces within Millennium Park in the Loop community area of Chicago in Cook County, Illinois, United States. The spaces are located along the south and north mid-level terraces, above and east of Wrigley Square and the Crown Fountain. In a conference at the Chicago Cultural Center, Boeing President and Chief Executive Officer James Bell to Chicago Mayor Richard M. Daley announced Boeing would make a $5 million grant to fund both the construction of and an endowment for the space.

== Details ==
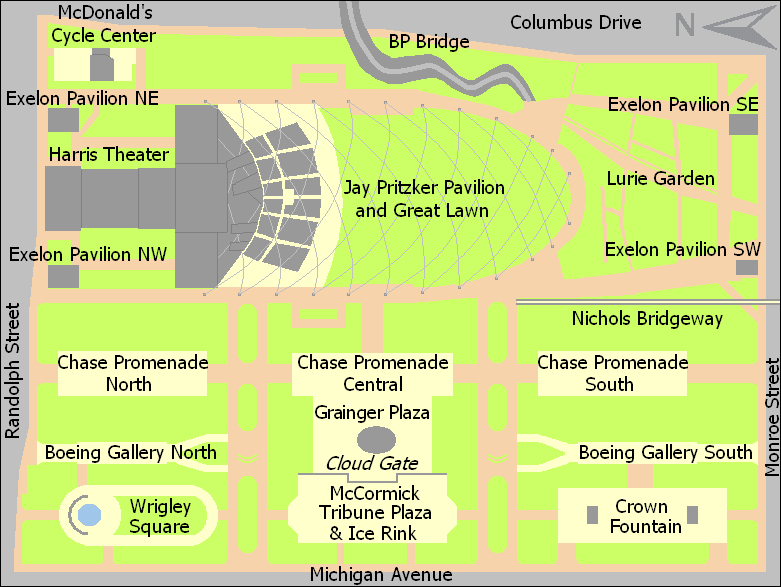
Image map of Millennium Park; east is at the top. Each feature or label is linked.

Lying between Lake Michigan to the east and the Loop to the west, Grant Park has been Chicago's front yard since the mid 19th century. Its northwest corner, north of Monroe Street and the Art Institute, east of Michigan Avenue, south of Randolph Street, and west of Columbus Drive, had been Illinois Central rail yards and parking lots until 1997, when it was made available for development by the city as Millennium Park. Today, Millennium Park trails only Navy Pier as a Chicago tourist attraction.

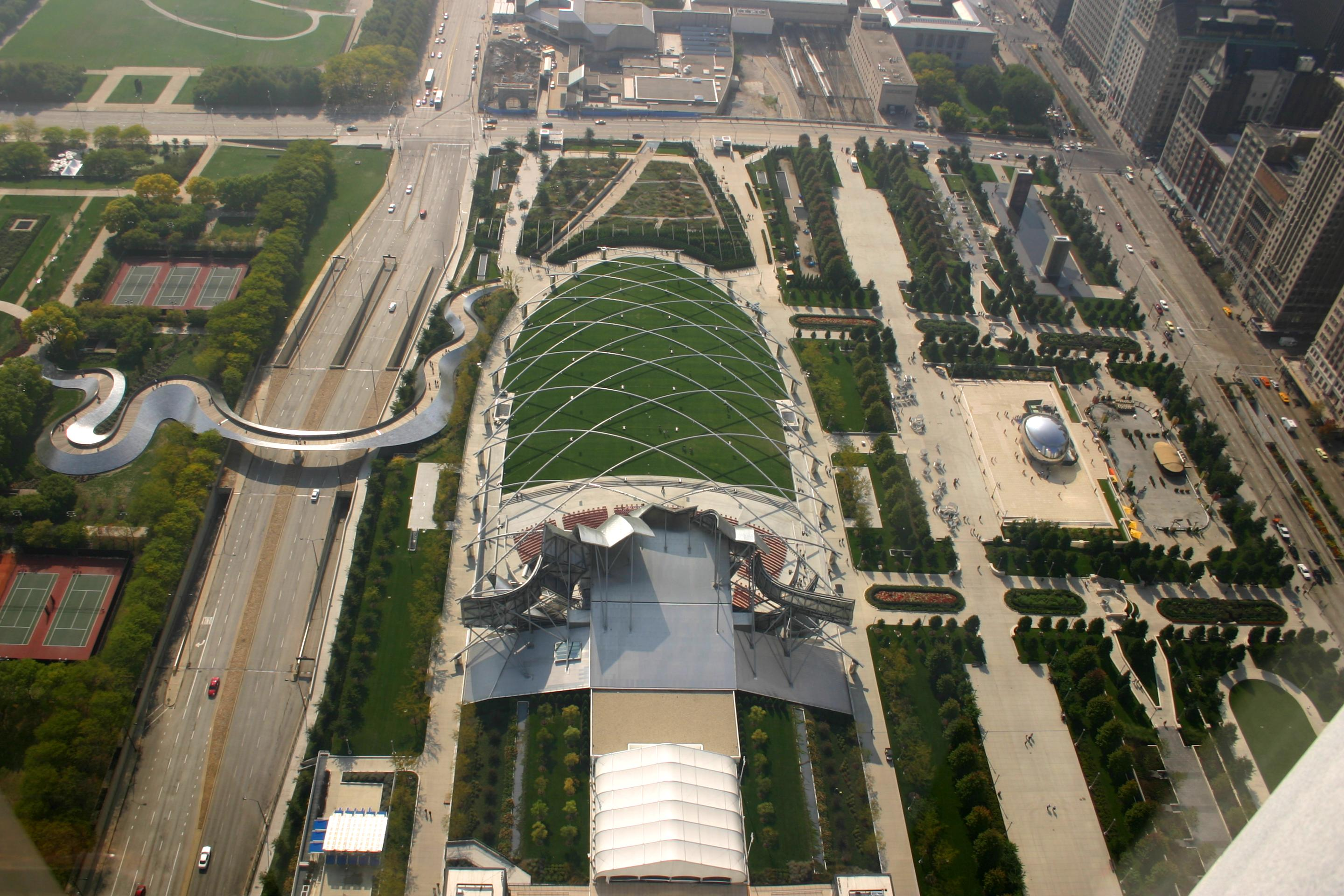
view of the park at the conclusion of the 2005 Revealing Chicago Exhibition

The city sought Boeing's financial support in the form of a $6 million donation. The purpose of the eventual $5 million donation was to fund a space for use as open-air gallery spaces to accommodate regular exhibitions of both visual arts and sculpture. The exhibitions primarily occur in the spring and summer months. The galleries were commissioned in December 2004 (after the park's first summer), and they provide necessary formal space for the presentation of public exhibitions of modern and contemporary art. Boeing also previously funded the Family Album photograph exhibition that debuted in Millennium Park during its opening weekend.

The galleries were constructed between March and June 2005. The south gallery is 19,200 square feet (1,780 m^{2}) (240 by 80 feet (73 by 24 m)) and the north is 14,400 square feet (1,338 m^{2}) (180 by 80 feet (55 by 24 m)). The galleries are surrounded by sycamore trees, which are very rare in Chicago. There is seating on a series of black granite steps, which match The Crown Fountain, along each gallery's east side. The South Gallery is connected to the fountain by a precast concrete staircase. The galleries are also paved in granite. The north and south galleries are physically separated by Grainger Plaza, which hosts Cloud Gate (The Bean).

== Exhibitions ==
Exhibitions

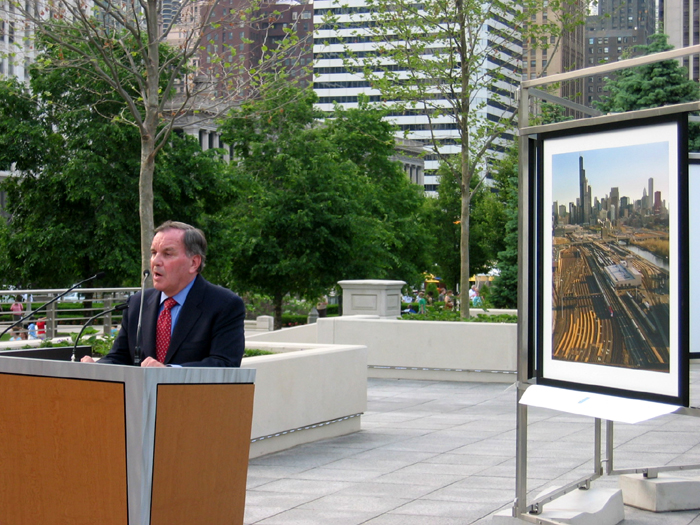
Chicago Mayor Richard M. Daley at the opening of the 2005 Revealing Chicago Exhibition in the Boeing Gallery and Chase Promenade in Millennium Park (South Boeing Gallery, 2005-06-09).

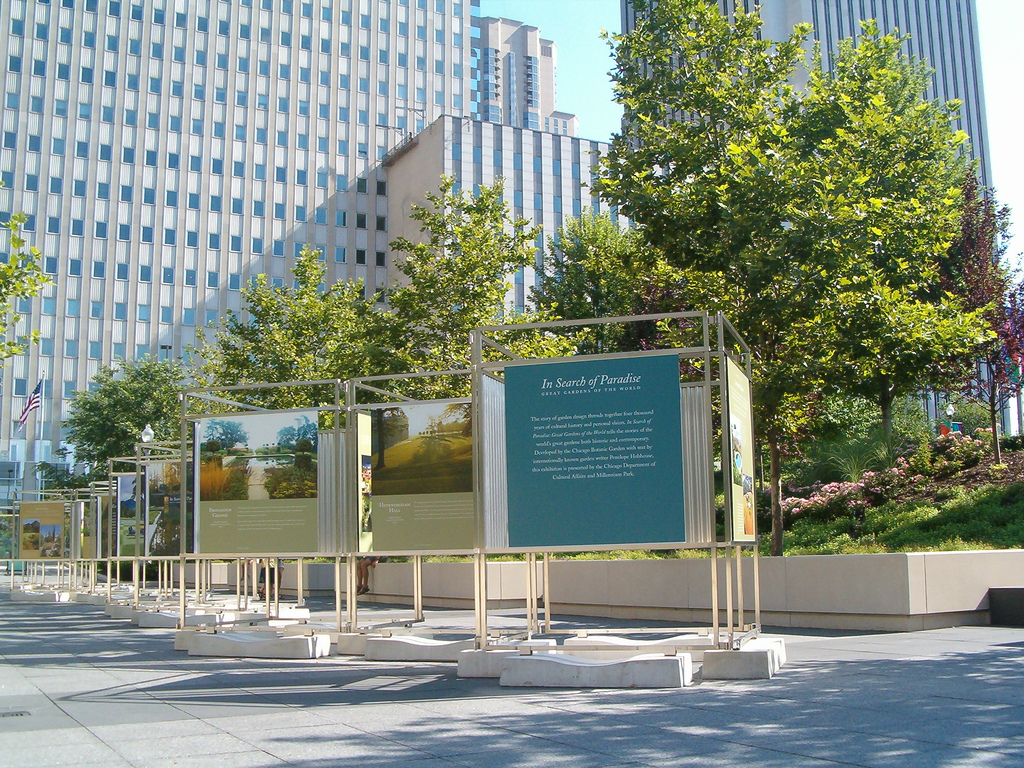
2006 In Search of Paradise Exhibition

=== Past exhibitions ===
2005

The first exhibition in the renamed Galleries was Revealing Chicago: An Aerial Portrait, which was displayed on the Central Chase Promenade and South Boeing Gallery, appeared from June 10 – October 10, 2005. The exhibit featured 100 images from Chicago metropolitan area taken on 50 flights that occurred between March 2003 and August 2004 at various seasons of the year. Photographer, Terry Evans, a Chicagoan, says that although 90% of the photographs were taken while in a helicopter, her preferred method of travel hot air balloon, but Chicago was usually too windy to shoot by balloon. At the time of the installation of the exhibition, the North Boeing Gallery was not complete so the exhibition partially took place on the Central Chase Promenade.

2006

Shang by Mark di Suvero in South Boeing Gallery (2008-06-02)

The galleries hosted In Search of Paradise: Great Gardens of the World from May 12 – October 22, 2006. The opening was delayed a week. This exhibition was developed by the Chicago Botanic Garden and included 65 photomurals of gardens from 21 countries including Lurie Garden. All of the photographs were less than five years old. The exhibition was curated by Penelope Hobhouse and presented by the Chicago Department of Cultural Affairs, Millennium Park with support from The Boeing Company and the Richard H. Driehaus Foundation. The photographs were formatted at 4 by 6 feet (1.2 by 1.8 m). The production schedule for the photomural formatted photography used was longer than expected, which led to the week-long delay in opening the exhibition. The exhibition was a thematic reference to the Chicago motto, "Urbs in Horto", which means city in a garden, and was a modern adaptation of a 2003 exhibition at the Chicago Botanic Garden. The exhibit provided viewers with an appreciation for the landscape design, aesthetics and the horticulture of gardens.

2007–2008

Mark di Suvero's Orion (2007, left) and Johnny Appleseed (1993, right)

The gallery hosted Mark di Suvero, whose large-scale abstract expressionism sculptures were on display from April 17, 2007 – October 12, 2008. The original duration of the exhibition was supposed to only be until April 1, 2008, but the exhibit was extended through the summer and fall of 2008. It is presented by the Chicago Department of Cultural Affairs, Millennium Park, in cooperation with Millennium Park, Inc., and is sponsored by The Boeing Company with support from the Richard H. Driehaus Foundation.

The exhibit included five pieces in total: two pieces in the North Boeing Gallery and three in the South Boeing Gallery. It was originally scheduled to include only four works. Orion, which was the largest of these, is a bright orange sculpture that measures 53 feet (16.2 m) tall and 12 short tons (10.9 t; 10.7 long tons). It has been installed on the North Boeing Gallery. The exhibit featured an interactive piece, Shang, which visitors were invited to climb on in the South Gallery. Shang was 25 feet (7.6 m) tall and had a suspended steel beam that acted as a swing.

Chicago Tribune art critic Alan G. Artner felt that the installation was a bit cramped in the Boeing Galleries. He explained that this was why di Suvero was limited to his midsize pieces and felt the Chase Promenade might have served as a better forum and left the artist unfettered to choose from a wider range of pieces. He also wondered why a city that abounds in public sculpture has not ventured to acquire any of his work.

2009–2010

A Conversation With Chicago: Contemporary Sculpture From China

Shen Shaomin's Kowtow Pump

Sui Jianguo's Windy City Dinosaur

The di Suvero exhibit was removed at the end of October 2008. In March 2009, the park announced its plans to install four large-scale contemporary outdoor works by Chinese sculptors in Boeing Galleries from April 9 – October 2010. The exhibition, entitled "A Conversation With Chicago: Contemporary Sculpture From China", complements "The Big World: Recent Art From China" exhibition hosted at the Chicago Cultural Center beginning April 25, 2009 but was conceived independently and is a distinct body of work. Chen Wenling's "Valiant Struggle No. 11", symbolizes Chinese society. The open-work sculpture "Windy City Dinosaur", created by Sui Jianguo stamped with the phrase "Made in China" is a critique on the cheap mass-produced goods that are building the Chinese export economy. "Kowtow Pump", is a caricature of the oil rigs by Shen Shaomin that will have limited Thursday active display times from June 11 through Aug. 27. Zhan Wang's "Jia Shan Shi No. 46" is considered the most abstract and depicts the scholar's rock in stainless steel.

2011–2012

Interconnected: The Sculptures of Yvonne Domenge

Wind Waves & Tabachin Ribbon

On February 1, 2011, the city announced that the April 6, 2011 – October 2012 Millennium Park Boeing Galleries, Large-Scale Sculptures Exhibition would feature the work of Mexican sculptor Yvonne Domenge under the exhibition title "Interconnected: The Sculptures of Yvonne Domenge". In addition to several traditional park sponsors, the exhibit is sponsored by the National Council for Culture and Arts, Richard H. Driehaus Foundation, the National Museum of Mexican Art, and the Consulate General of Mexico. This marks the first installation by a female or Latina artist at the Boeing Galleries. It is regarded as Chicago's last event of the "Mexico 2010" citywide yearlong 70-event celebration of the bicentennial of Mexico's independence and the centennial of its Revolution. These are the first sculptures by a Latina artist displayed anywhere in Millennium Park. The exhibition was three years in the making and preliminary sketches were on display at the Chicago Cultural Center in the fall of 2010. Also, prior to installation the sculptures' maquettes were displayed at the Chicago Cultural Center as a preview of the exhibit.

The city describes Domenge's sculptures as unifying perceived opposites and harmonizing apparent dissonances by geometrically referencing the natural world. The four piece installation includes a 16-foot (4.9 m) tall red-painted bronze sculpture, Tree of Life on the North Boeing Gallery, which stands as the tallest of work in the exhibit with its 4 feet (1.2 m) wide and 9 feet (2.7 m) tall pair of companion seeds. The tree and seed's represent life in it full form and its new emergence. They are said to represent the "Circle of life". The South Boeing Gallery hosts three steel spheres: Tabachin Ribbon, a 13-foot (4.0 m) tall yellow sculpture; Wind Waves, a white sculpture measuring approximately 16 feet (4.9 m) high and Coral, in blue, approximately 10-foot (3.0 m) high. Domenge's spheres defy gravity and space, conveying a rhythmic beauty and a sense of a larger universal order. The Boeing installation's spheres are said to express a type of beauty that pays respect to a larger universal order with reference to biological examples. The installation on the Boeing Galleries places the works above and to the east of Wrigley Square (North Gallery) and Crown Fountain (South Gallery). Domenge stated that she attempts to express the beauty of natures geometric order that it expresses in the molecular structures of flowers and plants. She feels that the spheres on exhibit in the South gallery depict the geometric perfection of the cosmos and that the celebrate this in a "festival of color and form". In keeping with her belief in the harmony of nature and out of respect for the park, she presented an installation that required no welding or screws.

2013

In 2013, the Boeing Galleries hosted ceramic sculpture by Jun Kaneko. The "Legends, Myths and Truths: Jun Kaneko" exhibit ran from April 12 – November 3, 2013. The exhibition included both old and new works by Kaneko. The old subject matter was work on Dangos and the new work focused on Tanuki.

==== 1004 Portraits ====
Laura, Paula, Ines in South Boeing Gallery

In 2009 starting with the 66 feet (20.12 m) tall Dream, Plensa began creating massive head sculptures. On June 18, 2014, four new large head sculpture pieces were added to Millennium Park in celebration of its 10th anniversary. Standing at 20 feet (6.10 m) tall, three of the works (Laura, Paula, and Inez) were located in the South Boeing Galleries. Each work depicts a female subject on the brink of maturation. They came from Barcelona. The fourth and tallest work at 39 feet (11.89 m), originally titled Looking Into My Dreams and by the time of its Chicago arrival titled Looking Into My Dreams, Awilda (or Awilda for short), was placed on Michigan Avenue facing Madison Avenue. It had been created in 2012 for an installation in Rio de Janeiro's Guanabara Bay and arrived in 15 pieces that were bolted together. Awilda is made of resin, while the others are made of cast iron. Jaume Plensa, creator of the adjacent Crown Fountain sculptures, named the four sculptures "1004 Portraits" because the sculptures added four new faces to the previous 1000 LED faces projected on the Crown Fountain. The works are on loan from Plensa and will be on display until December 2015.

He wanted the statues to have a dreamlike quality; as a result all the faces have closed eyes and are in a dreamlike position. Plensa wanted everyone who viewed the sculptures to dream with him and the sculptures.

==== Millennium Park: An Anatomy in Photographs ====
Located in the North Boeing Gallery, next to Wrigley Square, is the Millennium Park: An Anatomy in Photographs display in celebration of the 10th anniversary of the completion of Millennium Park runs from June 18, 2014 through October 2015. Curated by John Vinci and Hamp Architects, the display features over 58 images of Millennium Park before, during, and after construction, showcasing work done by 16 photographers. Some of the photos document construction of the park while others document its art and architecture, and other photographers used the park as their inspiration for their photographs.
