= Behind the Walls (sculpture) =

Sculpture by Spanish artist Jaume Plensa

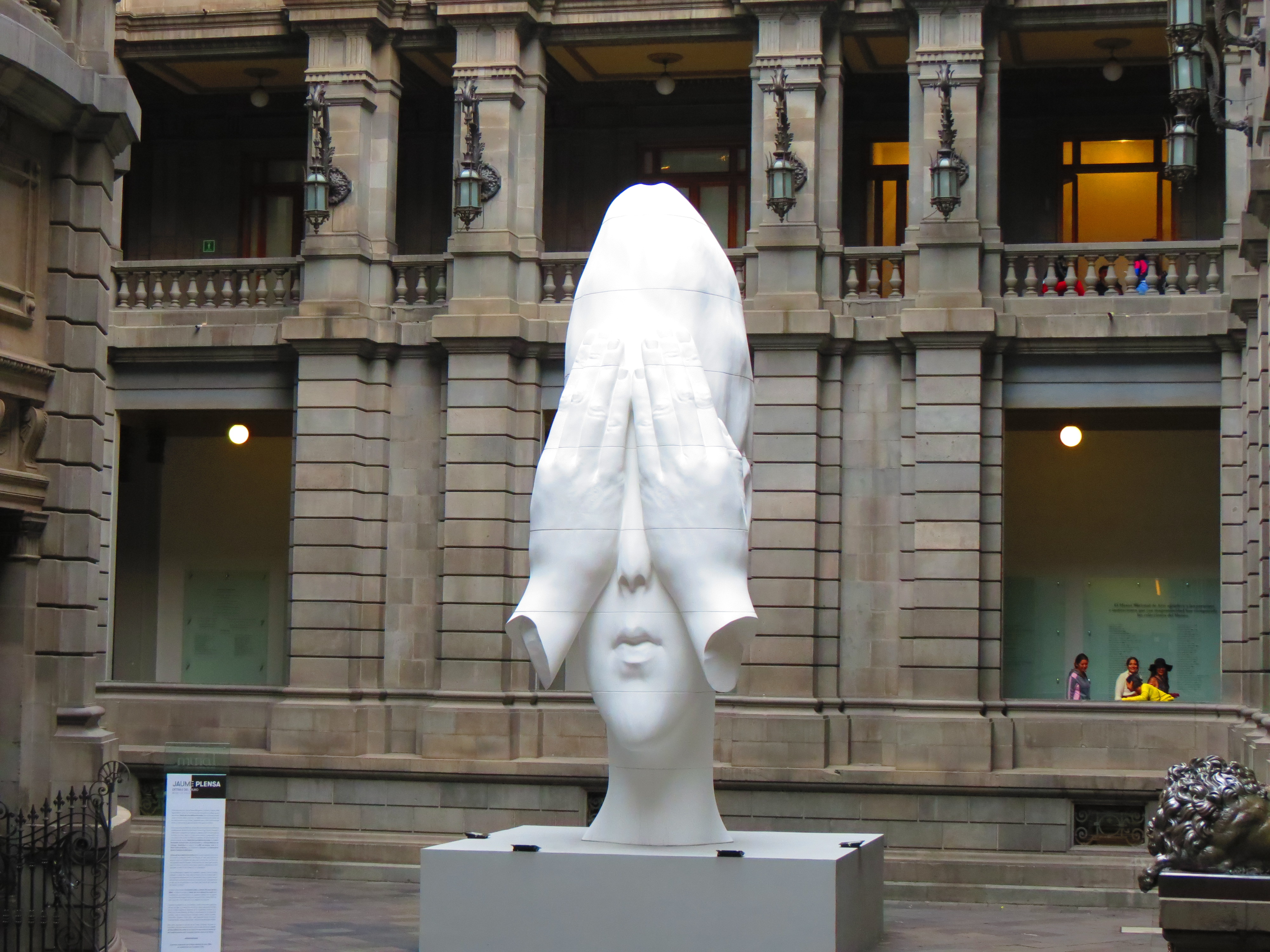
- Behind the Walls on display at the Museo Nacional de Arte in Mexico City
- Artist: Jaume Plensa
- Year: 2018
- Medium: Resin and marble dust
- Location: University of Michigan Museum of Art, Ann Arbor, Michigan, U.S.
- Owner: The University of Michigan Museum of Art

Behind the Walls is a 2018 sculpture by Spanish artist Jaume Plensa.

== Description ==
The sculpture is 7,46 meters or 24.5 feet tall, and depicts the head of a teenage girl who has her hands covering her eyes. It is made of polyester resin and marble dust.

== History ==
Behind the Walls debuted in May 2019 at the Frieze Sculpture festival in Manhattan, and it was on view at Rockefeller Center. From October 2019 to February 2020, it was installed outside the Museo Nacional de Arte in Mexico City.

Behind the Walls is currently outside the University of Michigan Museum of Art in Ann Arbor. The museum acquired it through a gift from J. Ira and Nicki Harris. The sculpture was installed in front of the museum in November 2020, taking the place of Mark di Suvero's piece Shang.
