= Burnham Pavilion =

Burnham Pavilion may refer to:

- Burnham Pavilions, public sculptures in Chicago
- Burnham Pavilion (Stanford University), an arena
