= Chase Promenade =

Coordinates: 41.8827°N 87.6229°W

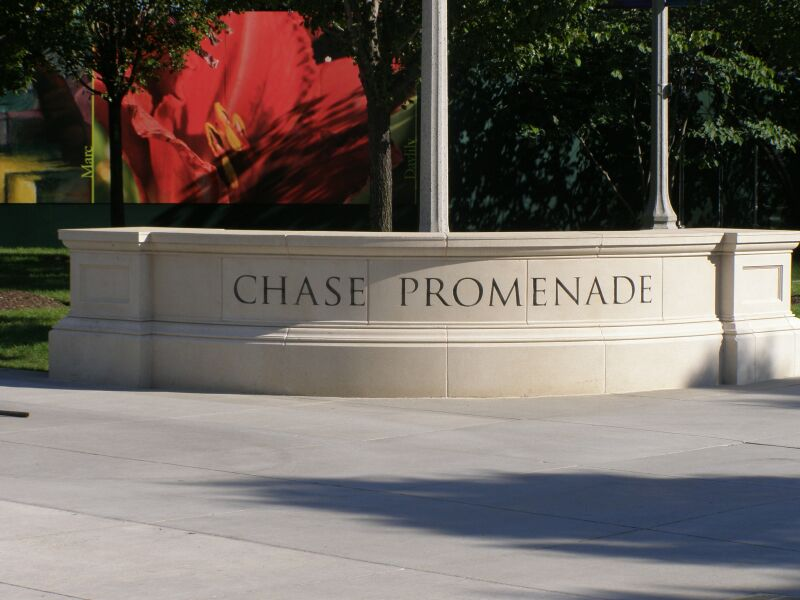
- Entrance to Chase Promenade
- Former name: Bank One Promenade
- Established: 2004
- Location: Millennium Park; Chicago, Illinois; United States
- Type: open-air gallery
- Public transit access: Millennium Station - Metra; Monroe/State (CTA) - Red Line; Randolph/Wabash (CTA) -Brown, Purple, Green, Orange, and Pink; Monroe/Dearborn (CTA) - Blue Line

Chase Promenade (formerly Bank One Promenade) is an open-air, tree-lined, pedestrian walkway that opened July 16, 2004. It is part of Millennium Park, which is located in the Loop community area of Chicago, Illinois in the United States. The promenade was made possible by a gift from the Bank One Foundation. It is 8 acres (3.2 ha) and used for exhibitions, festivals and other family events as well as private rentals.

The Chase Promenade has hosted the 2005 Revealing Chicago: An Aerial Portrait photo exhibition, the 2008 Paintings Below Zero exhibition and the 2009 Burnham Pavilions. The Burnham Pavilions were the cornerstone of the citywide Burnham Plan centennial celebration.

== Details ==
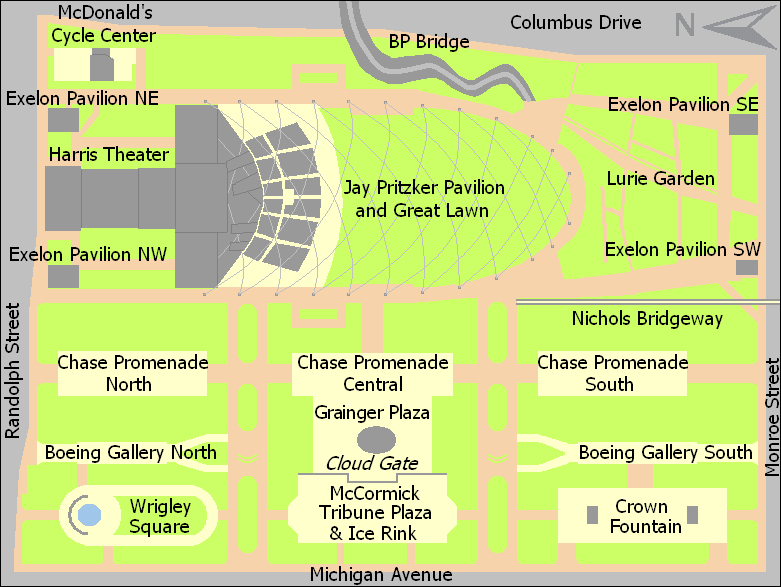
Image map of Millennium Park; east is at the top. Each feature or label is linked.

Lying between Lake Michigan to the east and the Loop to the west, Grant Park has been Chicago's front yard since the mid-19th century. Its northwest corner, north of Monroe Street and the Art Institute, east of Michigan Avenue, south of Randolph Street, and west of Columbus Drive, had been Illinois Central rail yards and parking lots until 1997, when it was made available for development by the city as Millennium Park. Today, Millennium Park trails only Navy Pier as a Chicago tourist attraction.

The Promenade, which spans the park from Randolph Street on the north to Monroe Street on the south, has three sections: North Promenade, Central Promenade, and South Promenade. Throughout the year it is available for private rental, and it has permanent tent anchors that make it accommodating year-round.

=== Past exhibitions ===
Revealing Chicago Exhibition
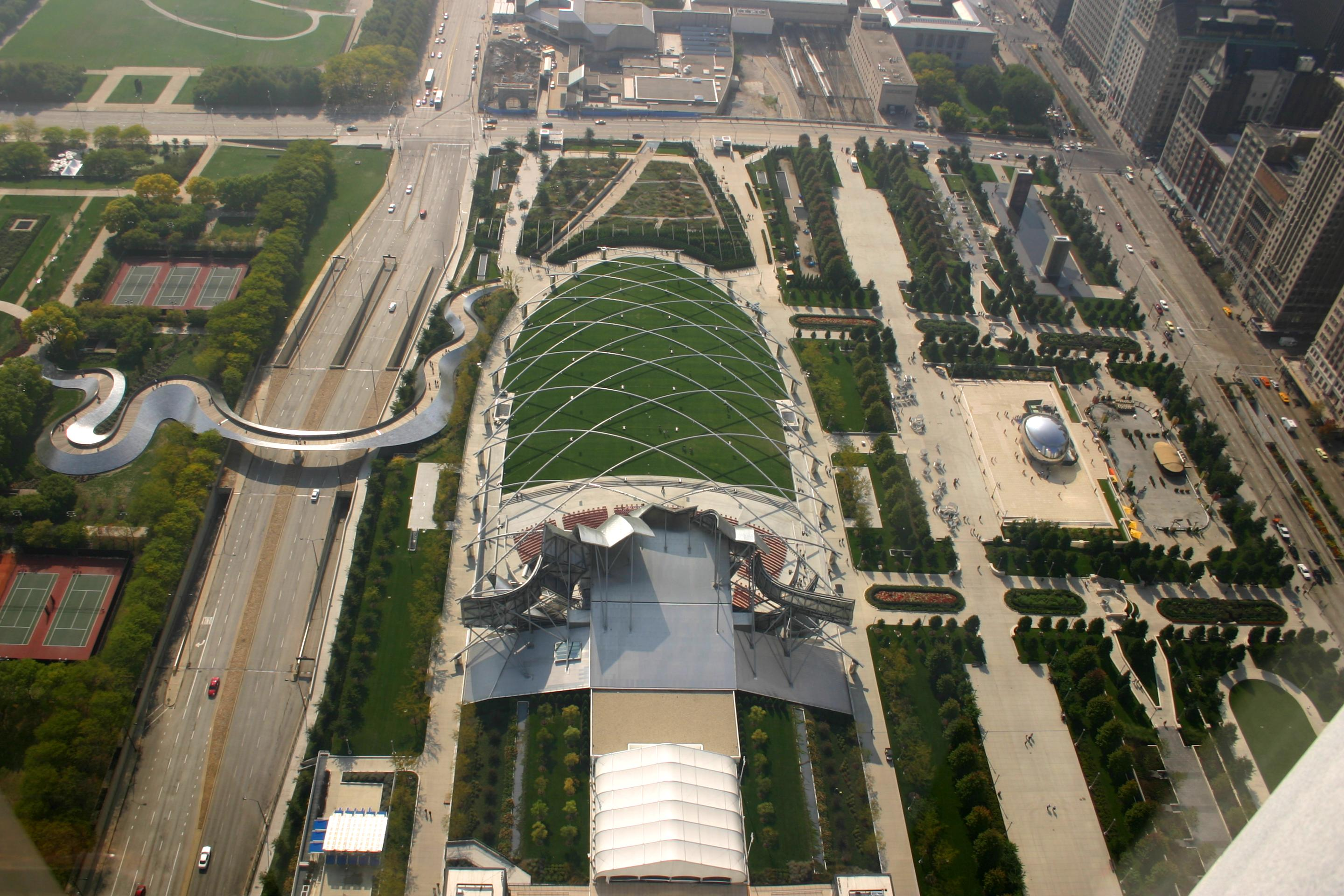
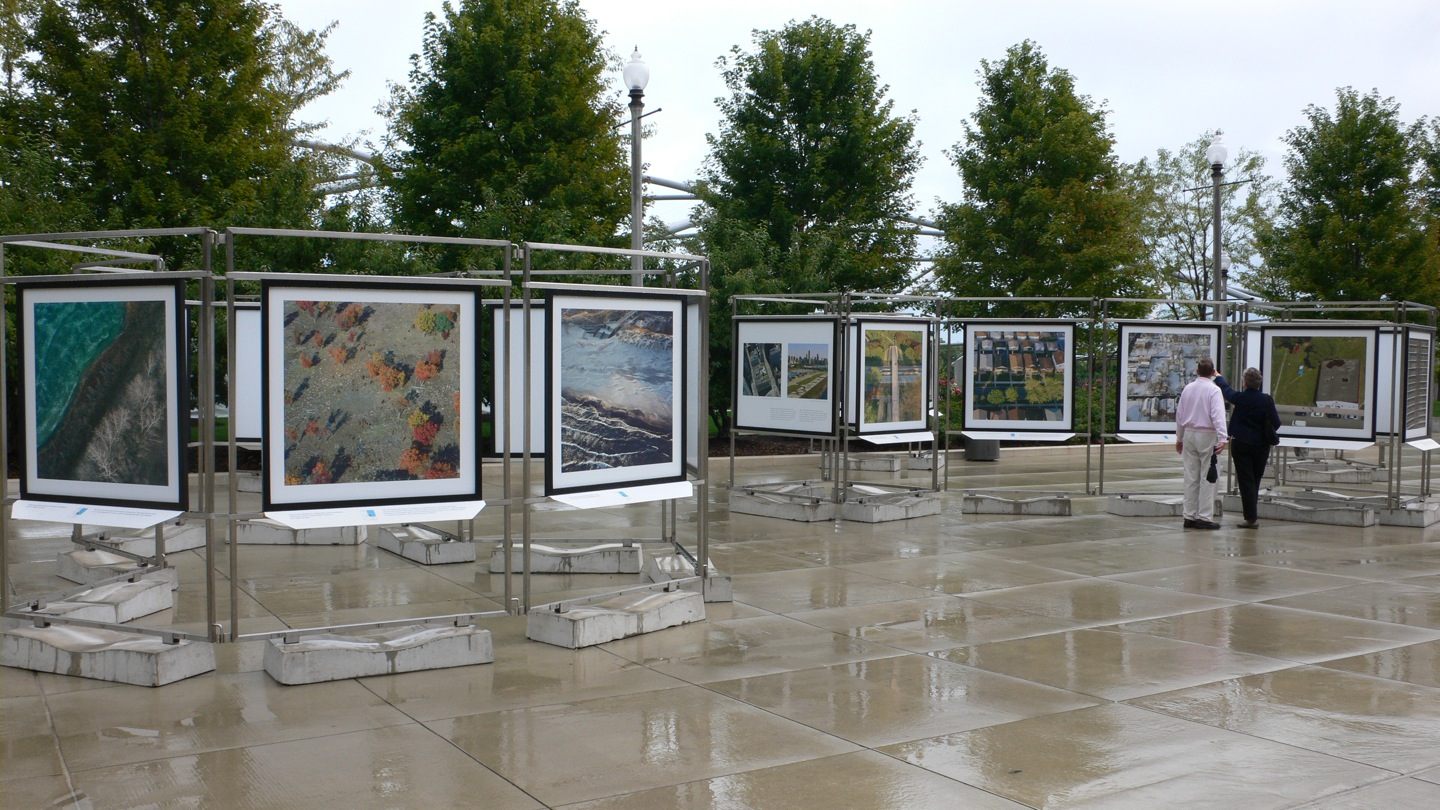
View of the park during the 2005 Revealing Chicago Exhibition

The city has used the Promenade to host several festivals and exhibitions.

Revealing Chicago: An Aerial Portrait was displayed on the Central Chase Promenade and South Boeing Gallery from June 10 to October 10, 2005. The exhibit featured 100 images from Chicago metropolitan area taken on 50 flights that occurred between March 2003 and August 2004 at various seasons of the year. Photographer Terry Evans, a Chicagoan, says that although 90% of the photographs were taken while in a helicopter, her preferred method of travel is hot air balloon, but Chicago was usually too windy to shoot by balloon.

In 2007–2008, the promenade hosted five sculptures made by Mark di Suvero, hosted at the smaller Boeing Galleries. Chicago Tribune art critic, Alan G. Artner, noted that di Suvero was limited to his midsize pieces because of the size of the gallery, and even these were a bit tightly bunched. He felt the Chase Promenade might have served as a better forum and would have left the artist unfettered to choose from a wider range of pieces.

Paintings Below Zero at the 2008 Museum of Modern Ice

From February 1 through February 29, 2008, Millennium Park hosted a winter celebration called the Museum of Modern Ice. This event featured an exhibition located on the Central Promenade by artist Gordon Halloran entitled Paintings Below Zero. The exhibition's centerpiece was an abstract artwork on the surface of four ice panels that measured 95 by 12 feet (29.0 by 3.7 m). In addition to the ice wall painting, Halloran painted the surface of the McCormick Tribune Ice Rink.

In 2009, the celebration of the fifth anniversary Millennium Park and the 100th anniversary of the Burnham Plan will include two temporary the privately funded pavilions located on the South end of the Chase Promenade. The pavilions by Zaha Hadid and Ben van Berkel will feature information highlighting the Burnham Plan and its implications for Chicago's present and future. They will be on display from June 19 – October 31, 2009.
