= Christina Olsen =

American art historian and museum director

Christina Olsen is an American curator, scholar, and museum director. In 2017 she became the director of the University of Michigan Museum of Art.

== Early life and education ==
Olsen was born in New York City and attended Bank Street School for Children and the Bronx High School of Science. She is the daughter of artist Earle S. Olsen (1926-2011), and sister of writer Victoria C. Olsen and artist Margrit Olsen.

She received her bachelor's degree from the University of Chicago (Phi Beta Kappa) and her PhD in Art History from the University of Pennsylvania. She is a scholar of Italian Renaissance art, and her dissertation on the origins of the tarot deck in the fifteenth century was the basis of the book "The Art of Tarot" published in 1995.

== Career ==
Olsen began her career at the J. Paul Getty Museum and Getty Foundation, where she was Senior Program Officer and began the Online Scholarly Catalogue Initiative. She was director of education at the Portland Art Museum from 2008 to 2012 where she originated and curated social practice projects "Shine a Light" and "Object Stories."

In 2012 she succeeded Lisa Corrin as director of the Williams College Museum of Art. At Williams she established WALLS, the museum's highly popular art loan program and developed a program and master plan for a new facility for the museum working with architect Steven Holl.

Olsen was named director of the University of Michigan Museum of Art in 2017. She is the first woman to hold the position. In the first few years of her tenure she created a long-term strategic plan for the museum. During her tenure, 72 works of Chinese calligraphy were donated, valued at more than $12 million. It was the largest gift of art in the university's history. In 2019 then-University of Michigan President Mark Schlissel named her co-chair of the university's new Arts Initiative.

In 2022 Olsen published an op-ed on Artnet about the future of art museums and the leadership role that university and college art museums should play.
