= University of Michigan Museum of Art =

Art museum of the University of Michigan in Ann Arbor, Michigan

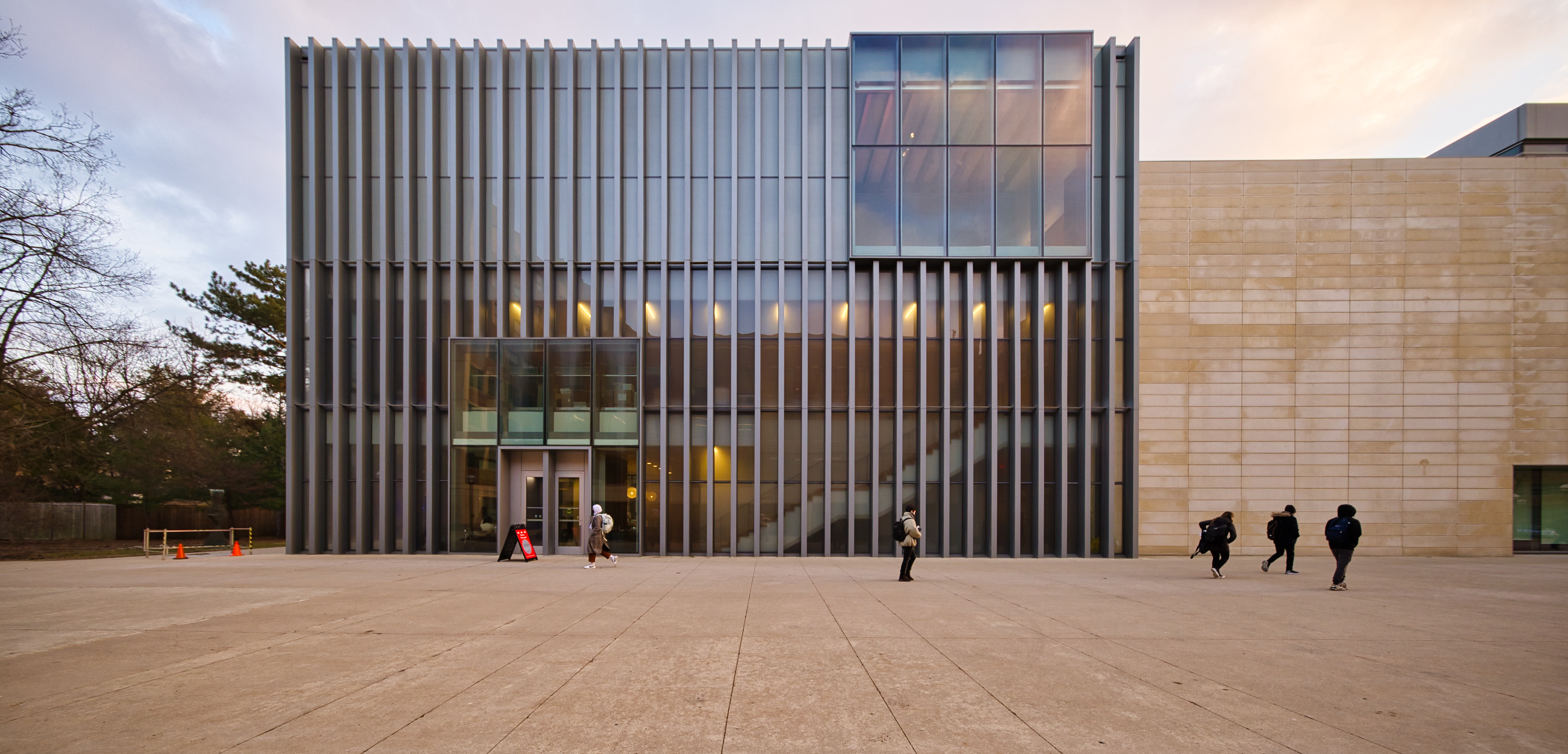
- Interactive fullscreen map
- Location: Ann Arbor, Michigan, United States
- Coordinates: 42°16′31″N 83°44′23″W
- Type: Art museum
- Director: Christina Olsen (2017–present)
- Website: umma.umich.edu
- Museum of Art (Alumni Memorial Hall)
- U.S. Historic district – Contributing property
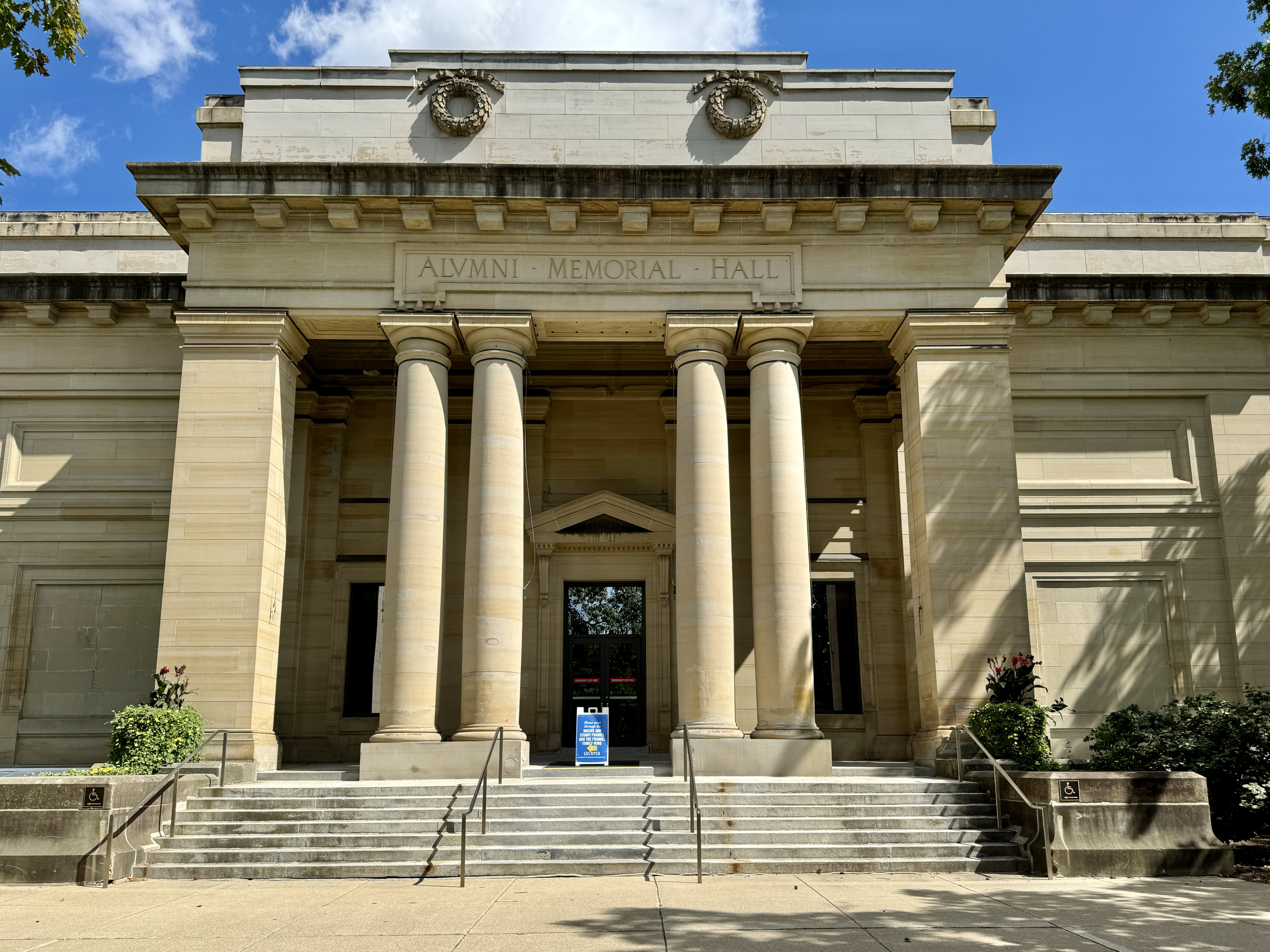
- Built: 1910
- Architect: Donaldson and Meier
- Part of: University of Michigan Central Campus Historic District (ID78001514)
- Designated CP: June 15, 1978

The University of Michigan Museum of Art (UMMA) is one of the largest university art museums in the United States, located in Ann Arbor, Michigan, with 94,000 sq ft (8,700 m^{2}). Built as a war memorial in 1909 for the university's fallen alumni from the Civil War, Alumni Memorial Hall originally housed University of Michigan's Alumni office along with the university's growing art collection. Its first director was Jean Paul Slusser, who served from 1946 (first as acting director, then becoming director in 1947) to his retirement in 1957.

The university contains a comprehensive collection that represents more than 150 years of history, with over 20,000 works of art that span cultures, eras, and media. Admission is free, but a $10 donation is suggested.

In the spring of 2009, the museum reopened after a major $41.9 million expansion and renovation designed by Brad Cloepfil and Allied Works Architecture, which more than doubled the size of the museum. The museum comprises the renovated Alumni Memorial Hall with 41,000 sq ft (3,800 m^{2}) and the new 53,000 sq ft (4,900 m^{2}) Maxine and Stuart Frankel and the Frankel Family Wing. The museum's current director is Christina Olsen, who was appointed in 2017.

== Construction ==
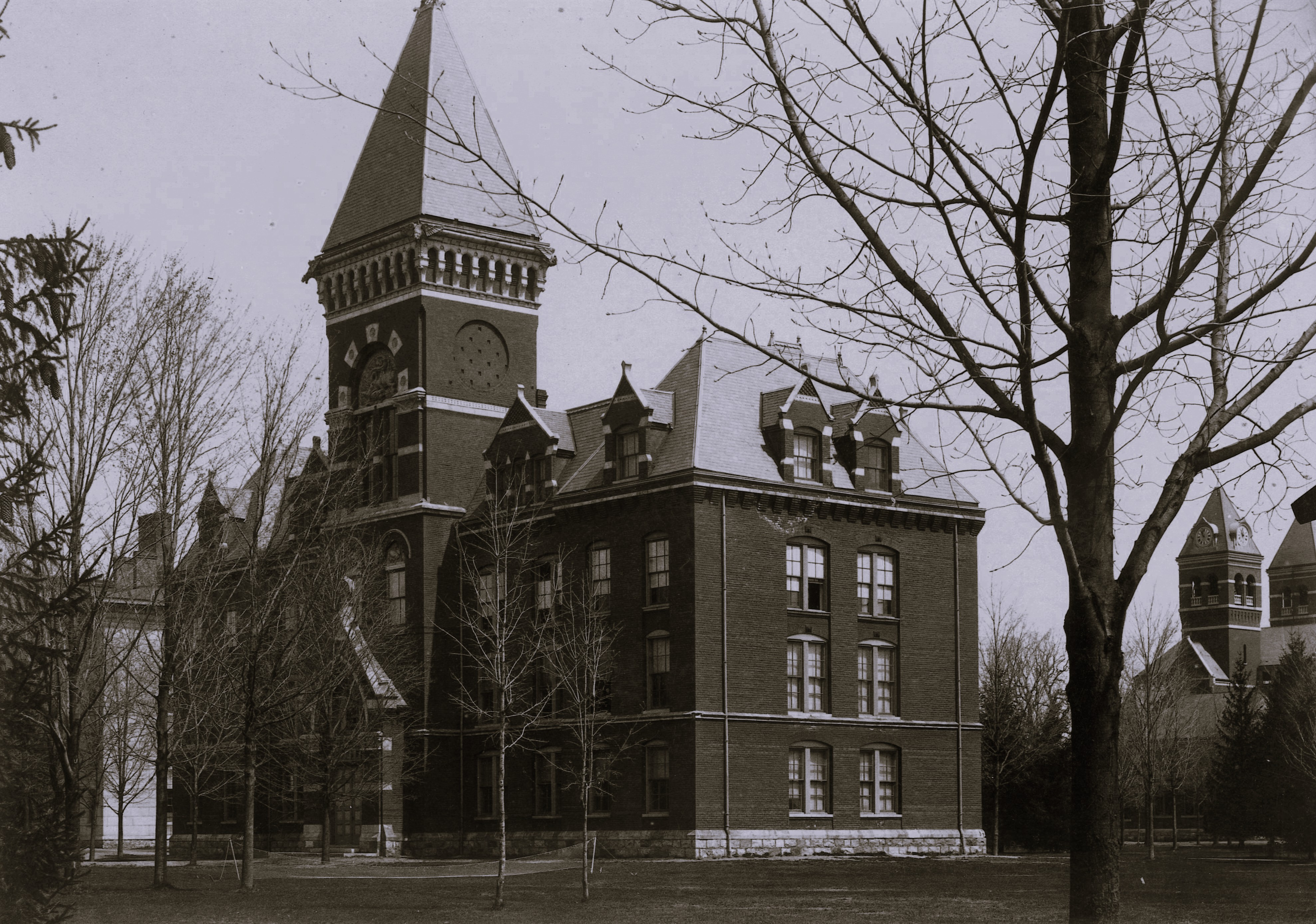
Old University Museum, built 1880-1881. Housed the university's collections in anthropology and natural history.

Alumni Memorial Hall was originally conceived in 1864 as a way to honor the University of Michigan students, faculty, and alumni who had died fighting in the Civil War. However, the project was put on hold until 1904, when a committee of Michigan alumni and professors, led by Professor Martin Luther D'Ooge and Judge Claudius B. Grant, secured a promissory note from the Board of Regents for the land the hall would eventually be built on.

With the land set aside, the Board of Regents created a committee to work in parallel with the Alumni Memorial Committee in 1905, and by the end of the year had awarded the project to the Detroit architecture firm Donaldson and Meier at the cost of $175,000. The hall's cornerstone was laid by Judge Grant and construction began in June 1908. Alumni Memorial Hall was dedicated on May 11, 1910, with a final building cost of $190,000.

The hall itself was built in the neoclassical tradition with a pair of two stone columns flanking the hall's main bronze doors with two smaller side doors. The inside continues to house the Alumni Association's headquarters and the university's vast art collection alongside pieces donated by alumni, including a bust of the university's first president Henry Philip Tappan. It also housed the University Club, before the club moved across the street to the Union.

== Artwork ==
=== Permanent collection ===
The museum's permanent collection includes work by James McNeill Whistler, Franz Kline, Helen Frankenthaler, Pablo Picasso, Joshua Reynolds, Claude Monet, Max Beckmann, Walker Evans, Randolph Rogers, Kara Walker, Alvin D. Loving, Christian Boltanski, Donald Sultan, Jenny Holzer, Tracey Emin, Louise Nevelson, Yinka Shonibare, Romare Bearden, Michele Oka Doner, Hiram Powers, Mark di Suvero, Tiffany & Co., Katsushika Hokusai, Utagawa Toyokuni I, Shigeo Fukuda, Alexander Calder, Marian Spore Bush, and Grace Hartigan, among many others.

==== Outdoor artwork ====
The Mark di Suvero sculpture Orion was installed in front of the building from 2008 to 2018, then removed briefly for conservation, and reinstalled permanently in 2019.

The kinetic sculpture Shang was a long-term loan to the university that stood outside the building from 2008 to 2020, when it was bought by a private collector. In November 2020, the Jaume Plensa piece Behind the Walls was installed in its place.

Other sculptures outside of the museum include Daedalus by Charles Ginnever, Ternary Marker by Beverly Pepper, Stiff Box No. 12 by Lucas Samaras, Requiem by Erwin Binder, and a trio of pieces by Michele Oka Doner.

=== Temporary exhibitions ===
Temporary exhibitions at the museum have included work by Meleko Mokgosi, Mari Katayama, Ceal Floyer, Paul Rand, and others.

== Gallery ==
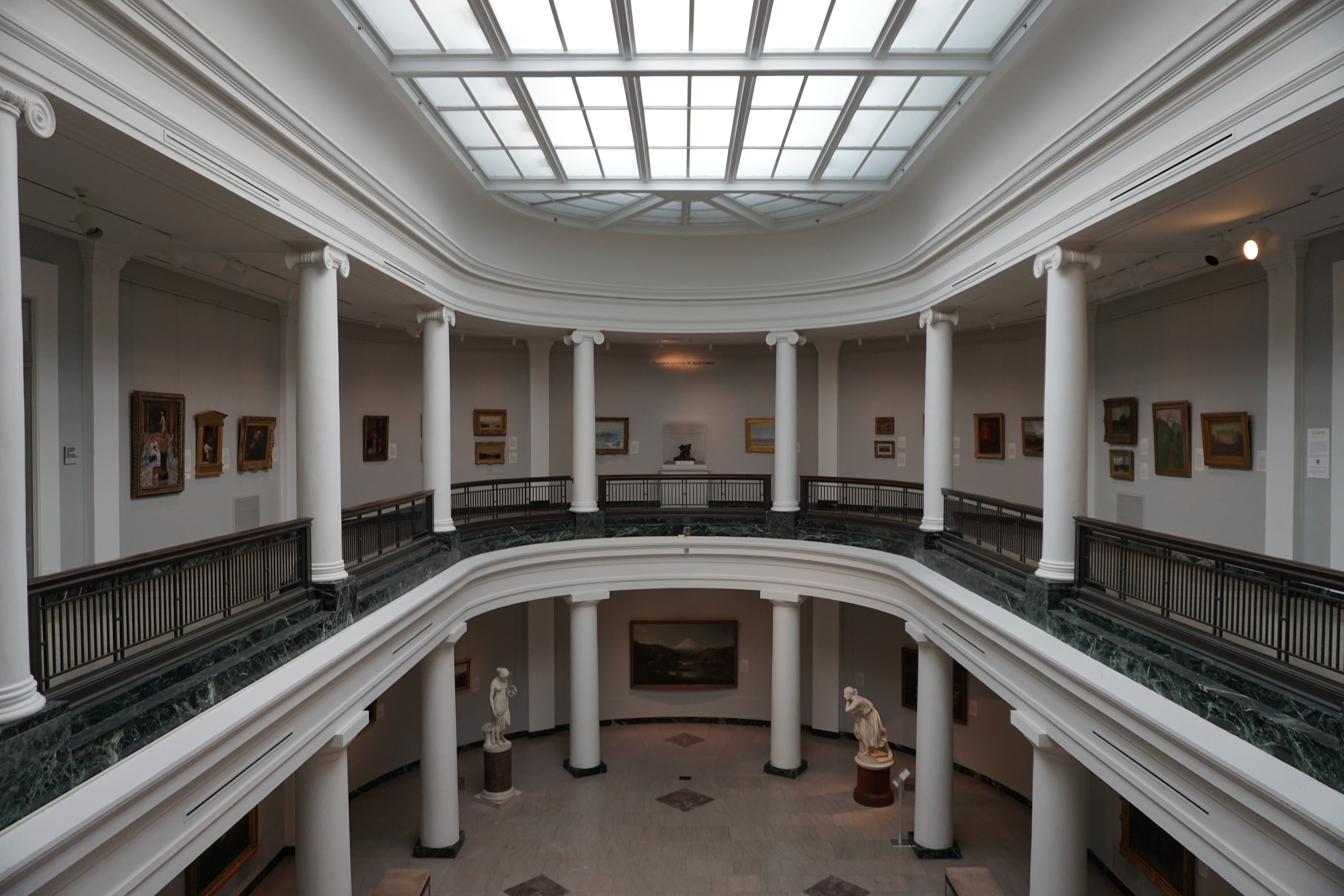
European & American Art Gallery, University of Michigan Museum of Art

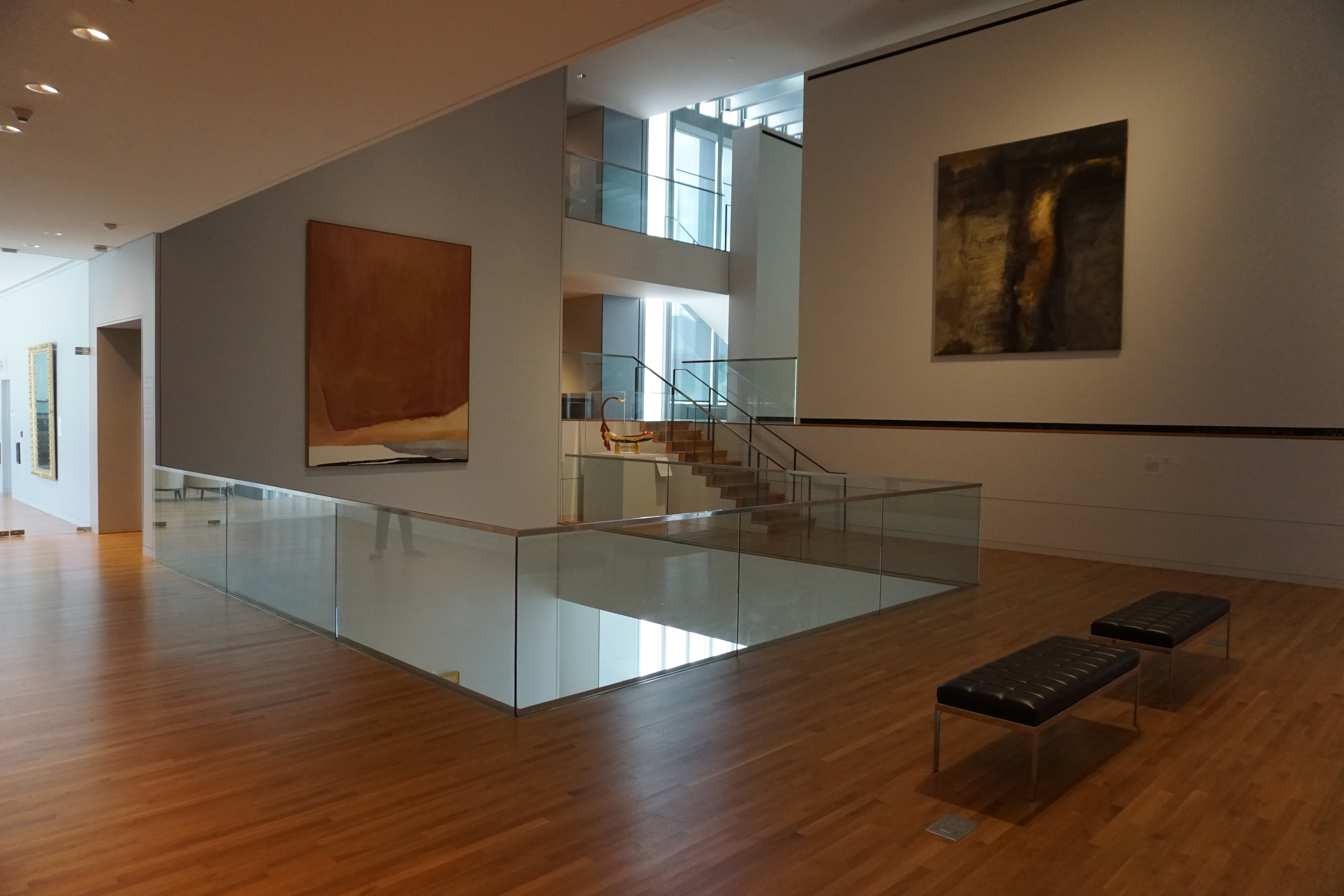
Interior, University of Michigan Museum of Art

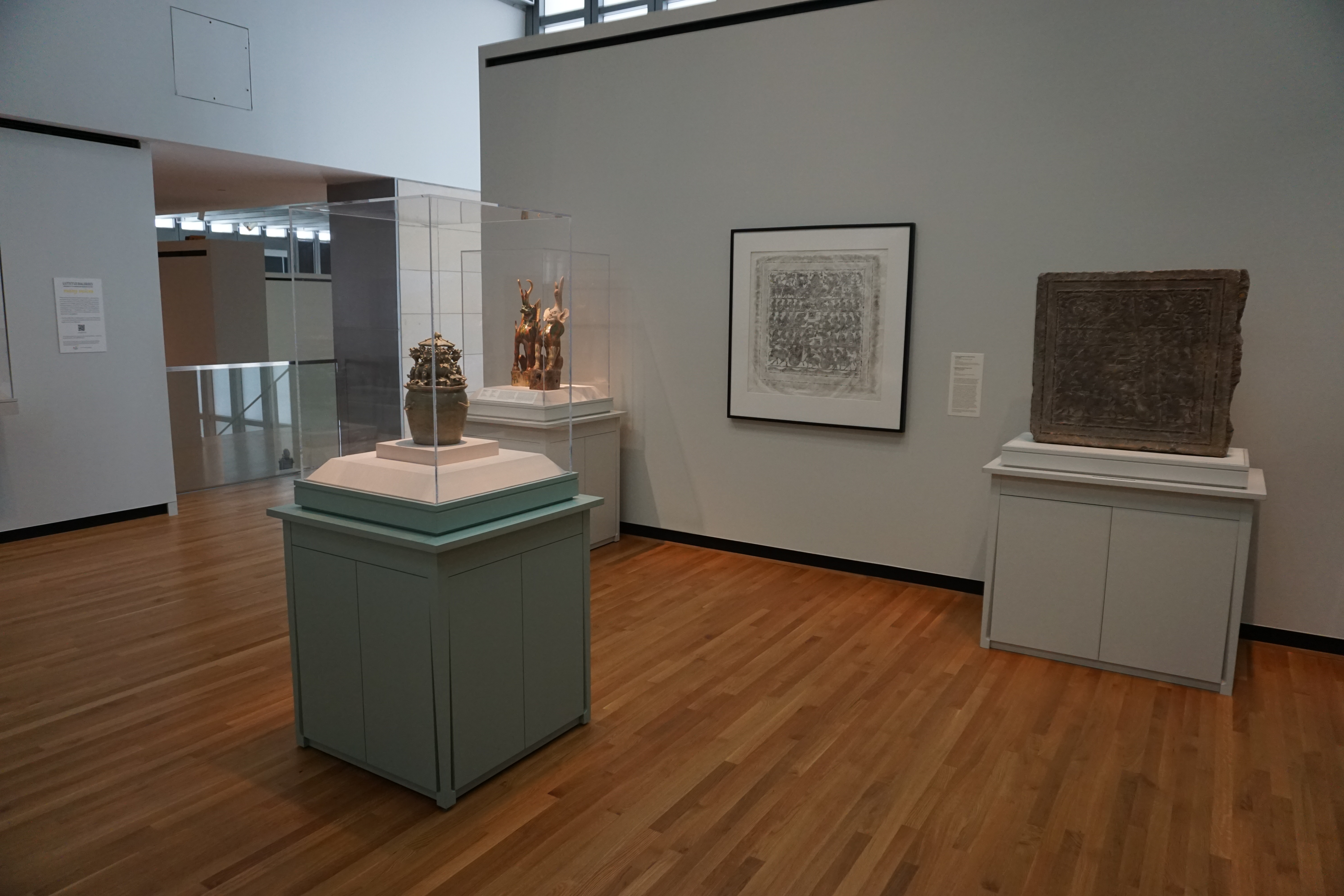
Chinese Art Gallery, University of Michigan Museum of Art

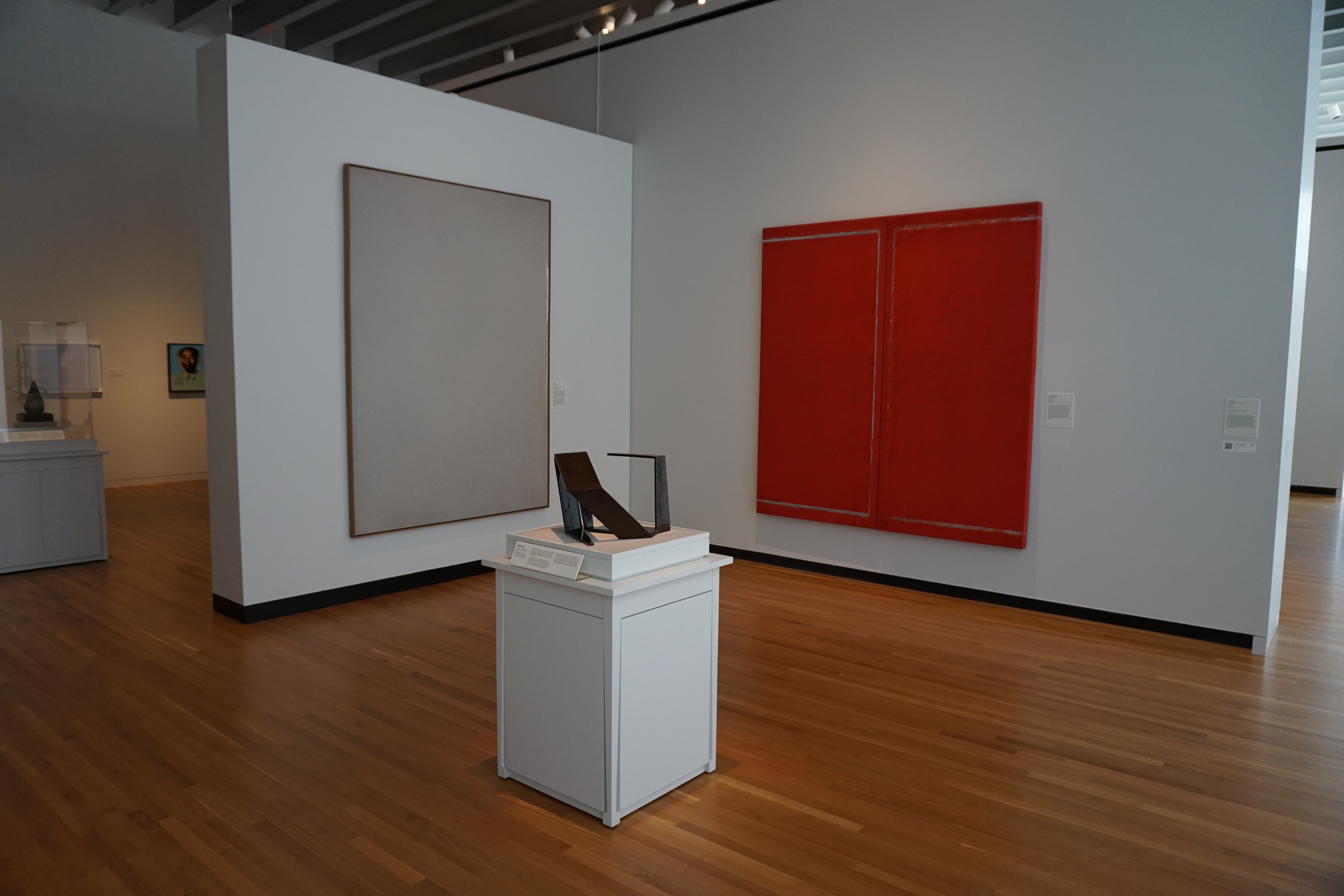
Modern & Contemporary Gallery, University of Michigan Museum of Art

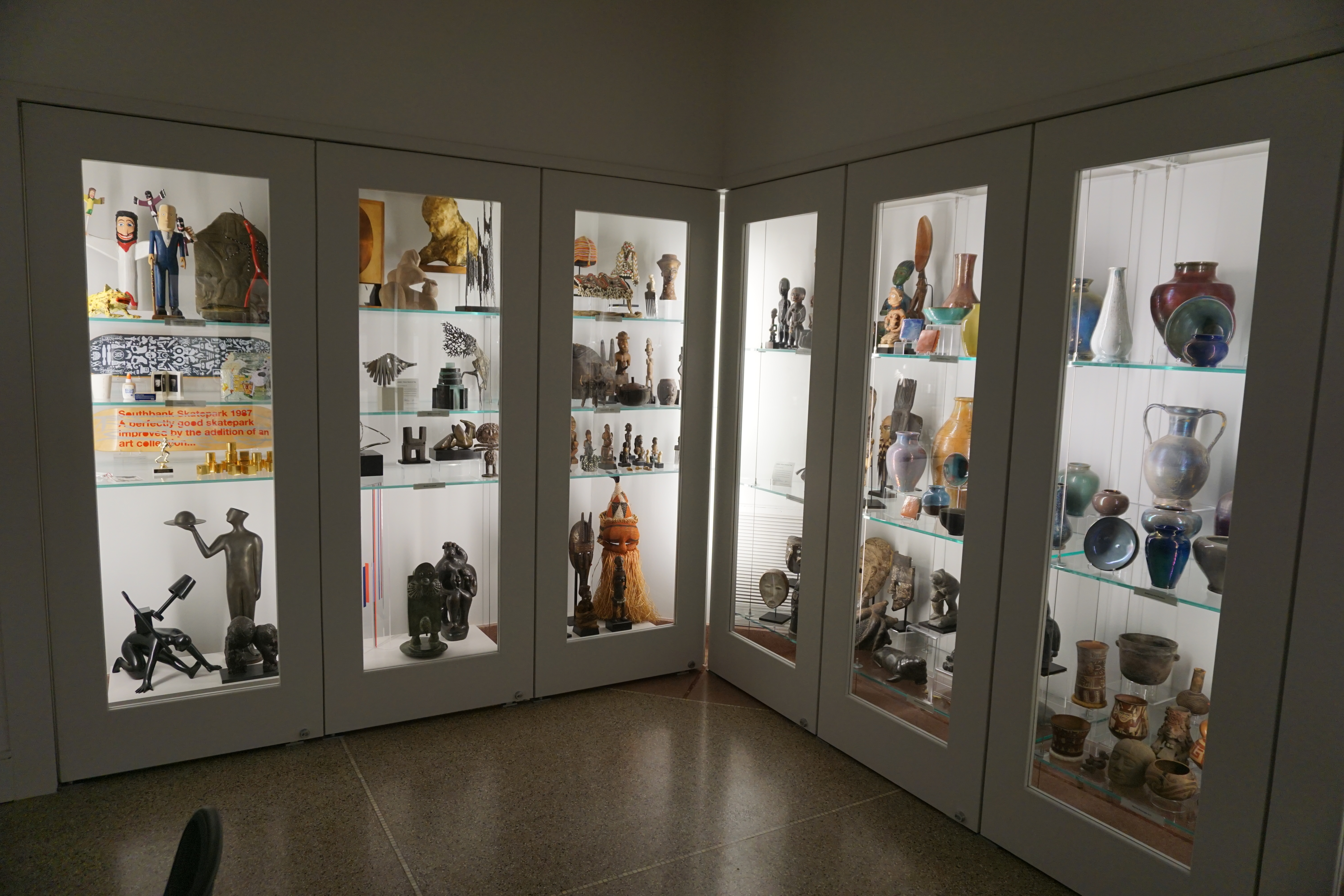
Open Storage, University of Michigan Museum of Art

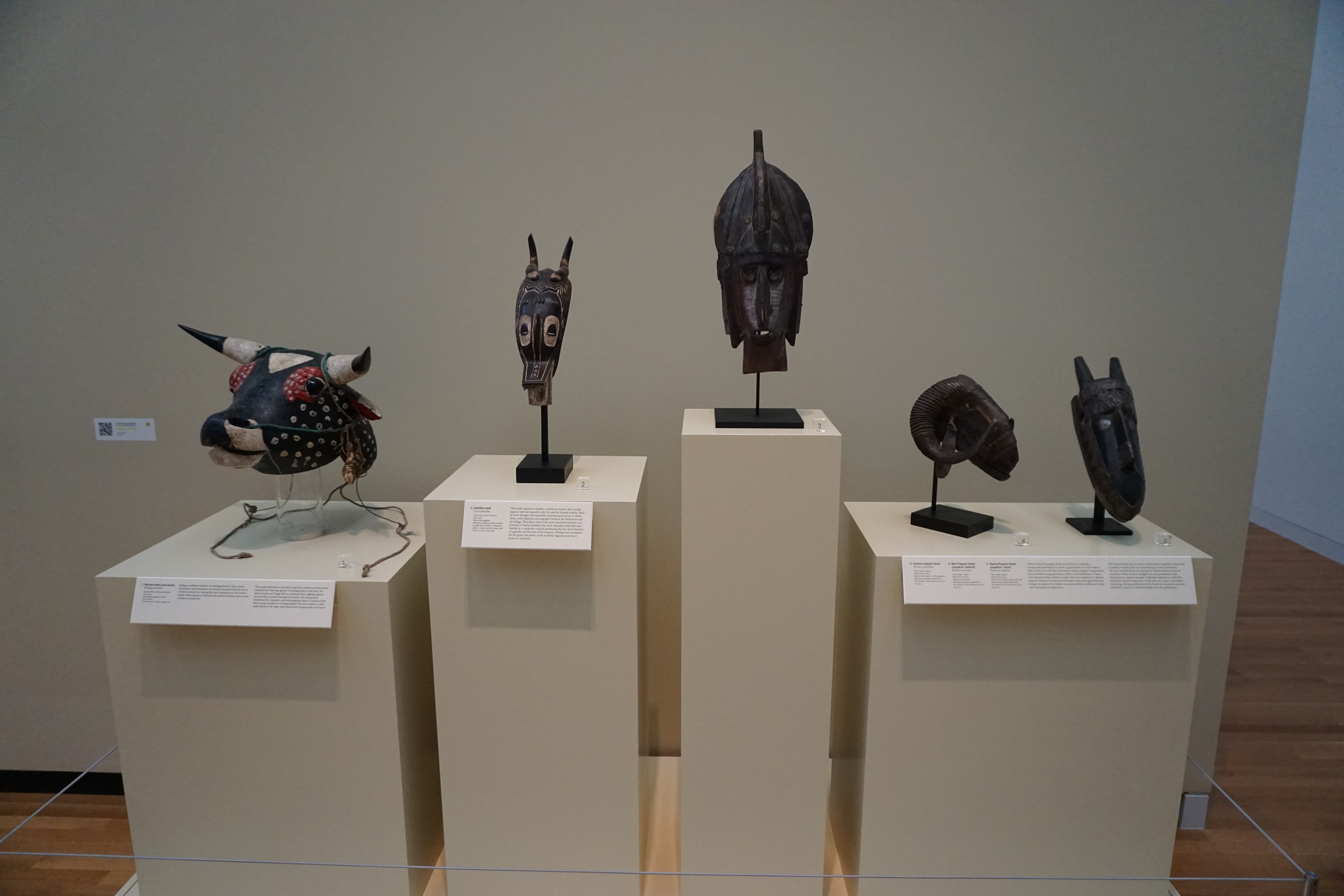
African Art Gallery, University of Michigan Museum of Art

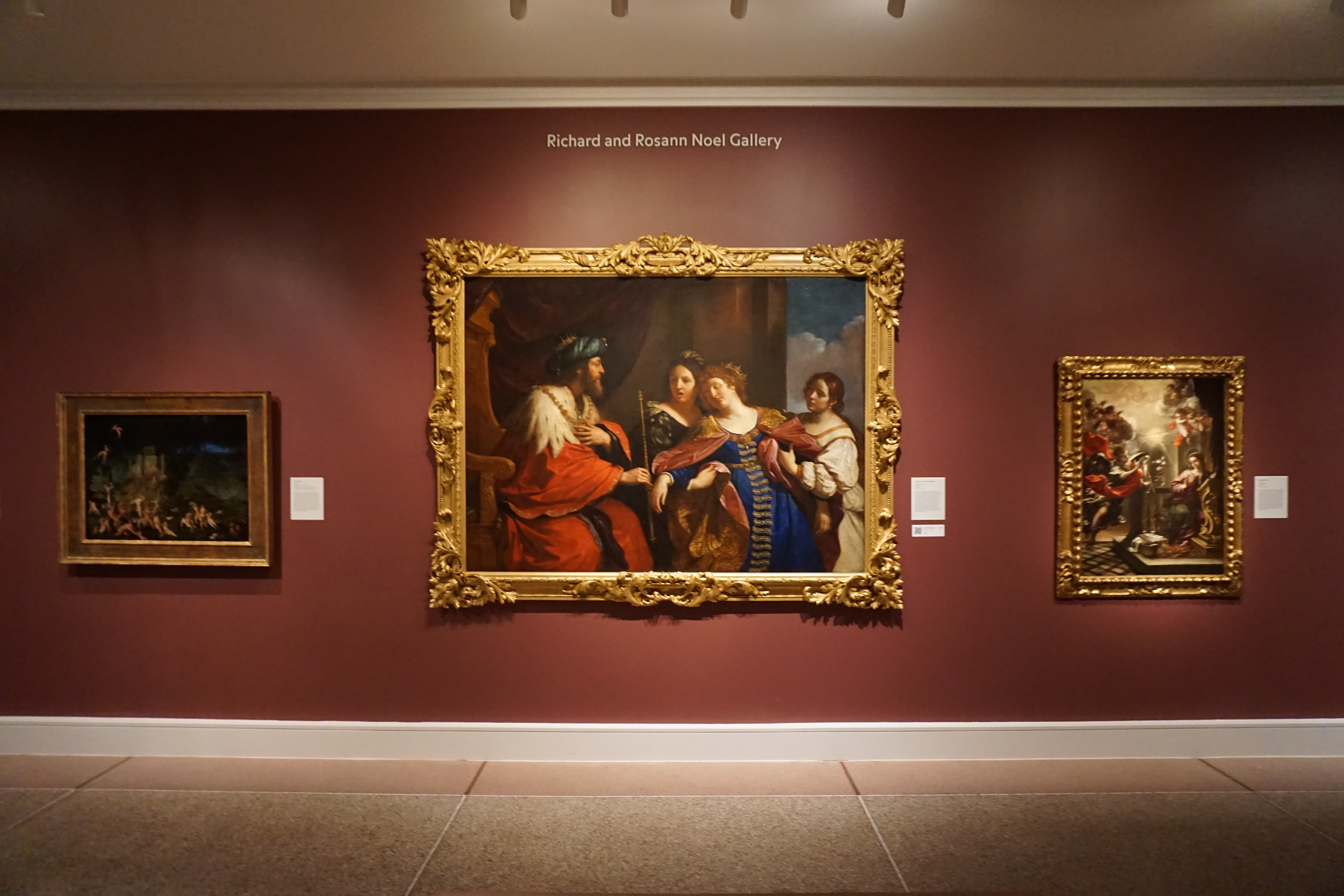
European Art (1100–1650) Gallery, University of Michigan Museum of Art

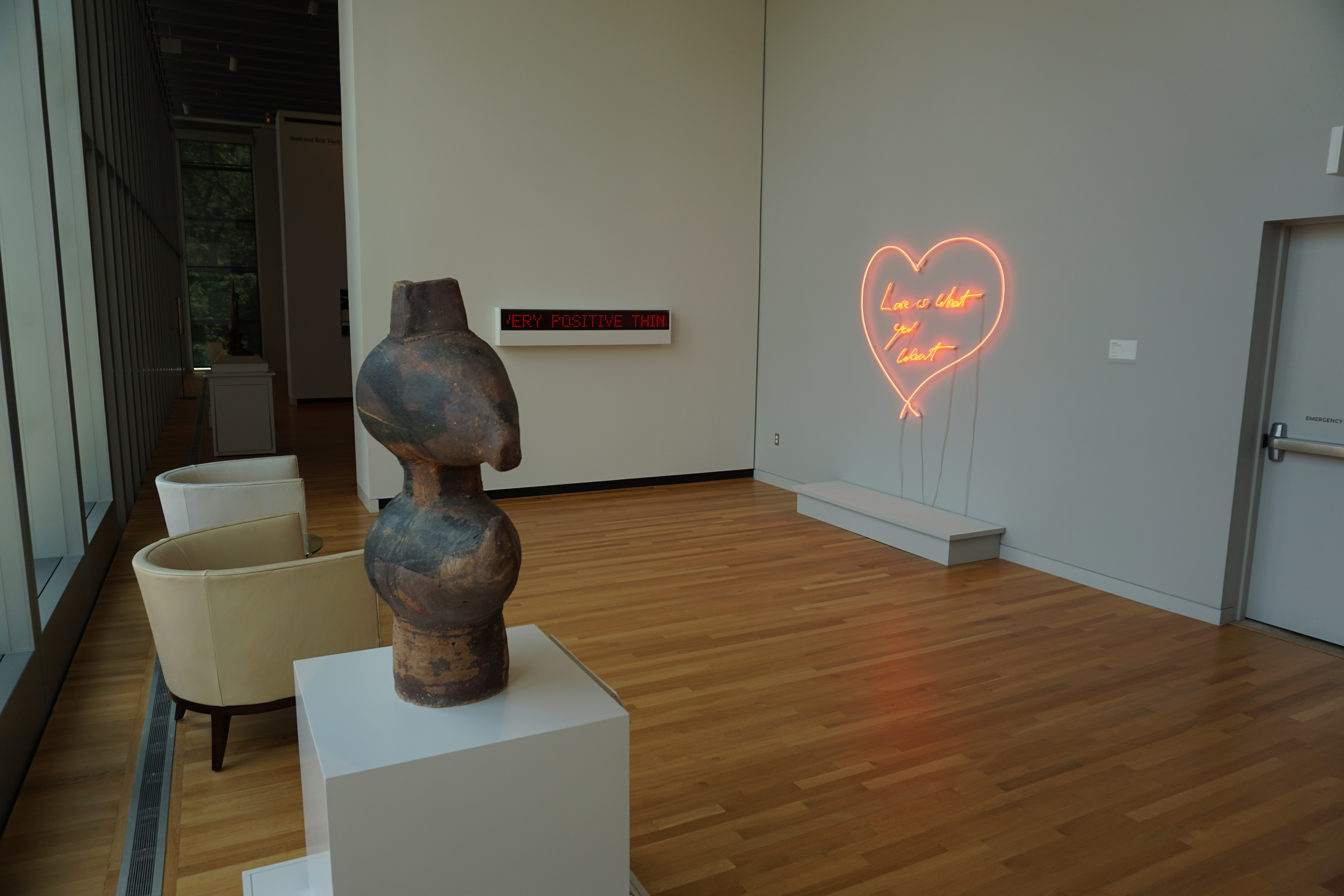
Modern & Contemporary Gallery, University of Michigan Museum of Art

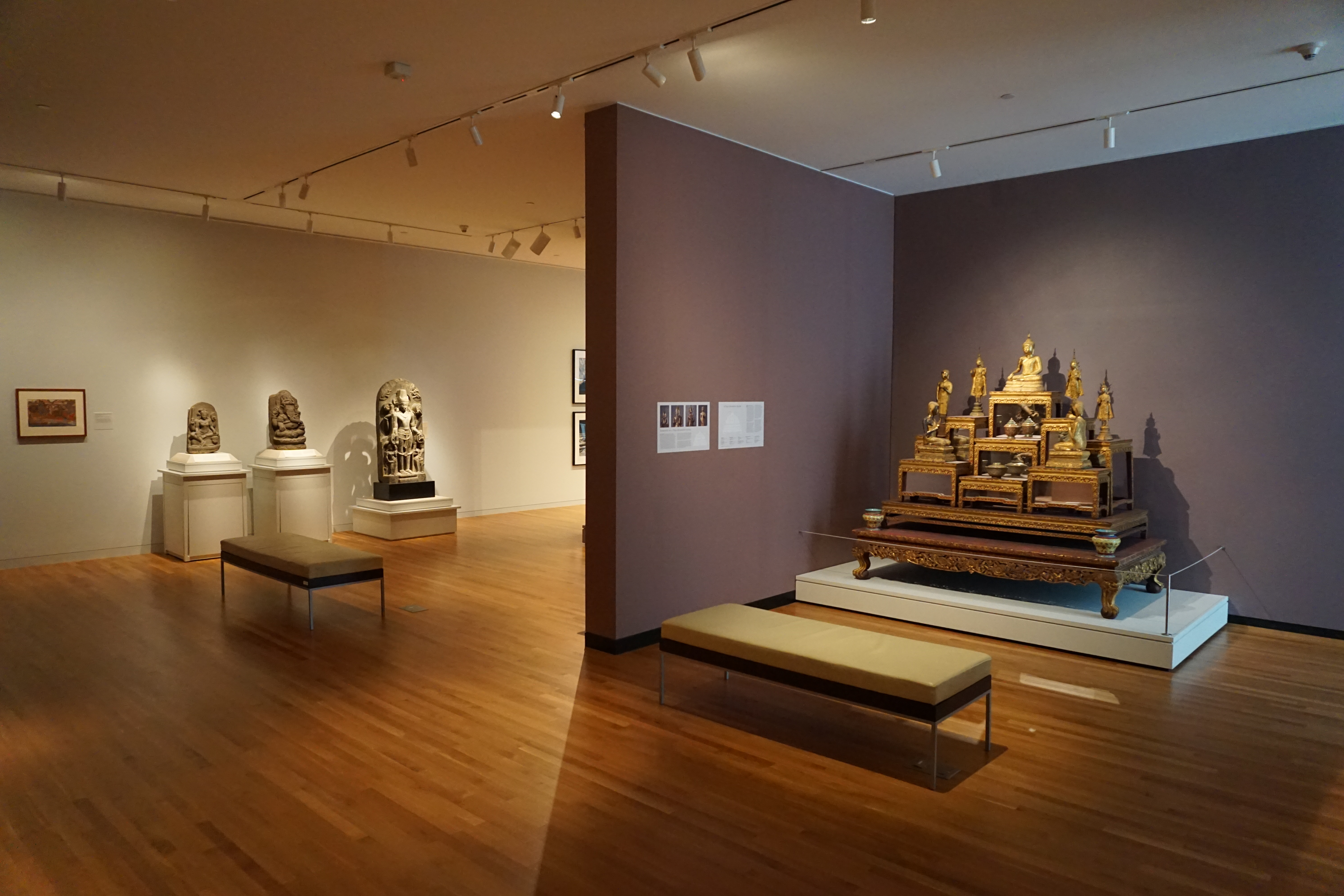
South, Southeast, and Central Asian Art Gallery, University of Michigan Museum of Art

=== Provenance research ===
In 2007, the museum concluded a three-year investigation that found no evidence any of its artwork had been looted by Nazis during World War II.

== See also ==
- Cranbrook Art Museum
- Detroit Institute of Arts
- Museums at the University of Michigan
- Tourism in metropolitan Detroit
- Michigan in the American Civil War
