= Shang (sculpture) =

American kinetic sculpture

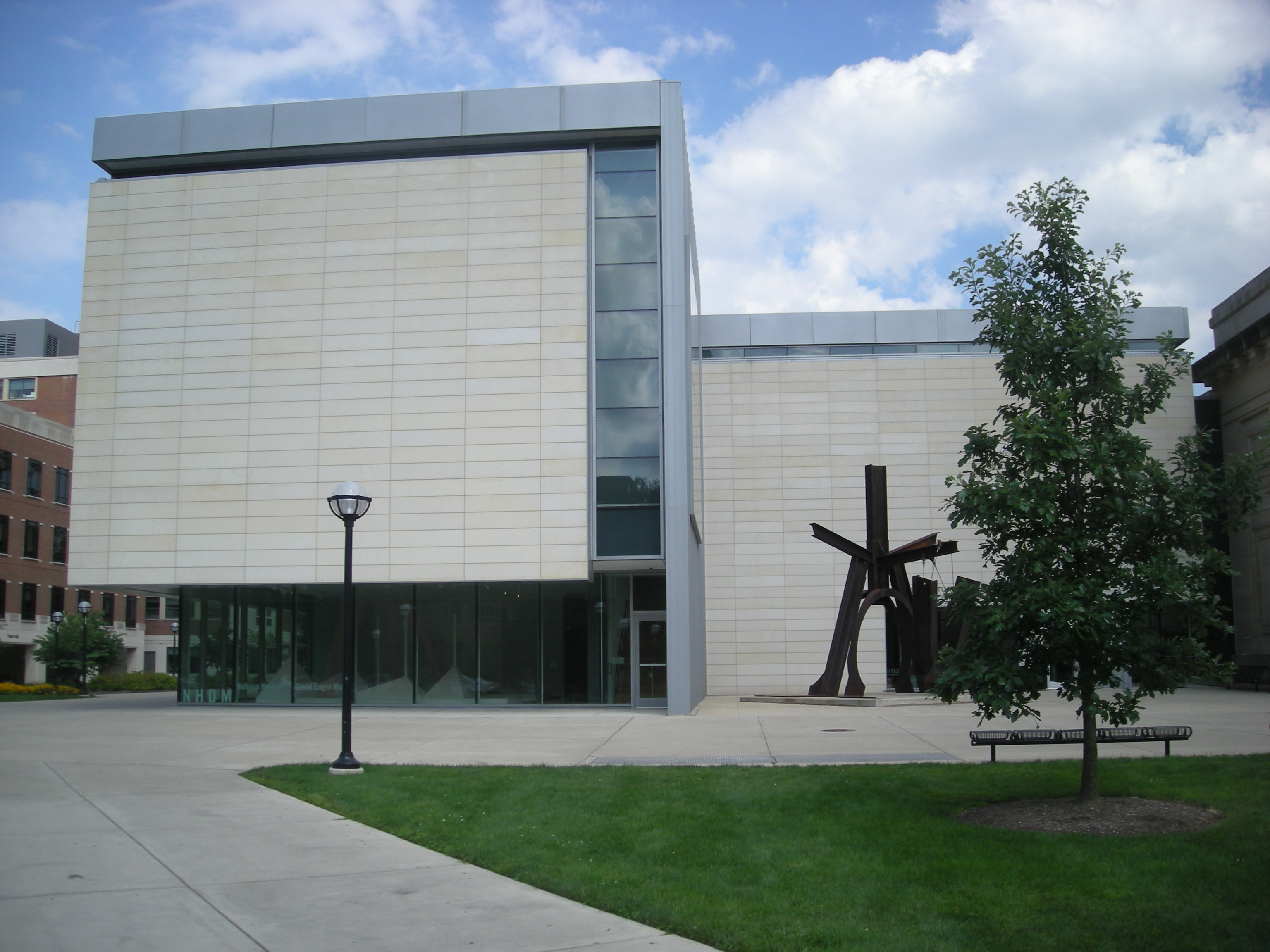
Shang was installed in front of the University of Michigan Museum of Art from 2008 to 2020.

Shang is a public art work by artist Mark di Suvero located at the University of Michigan Museum of Art (UMMA) in Ann Arbor, Michigan. The kinetic sculpture is an abstract form; it was installed on the sidewalk by the Maxine and Stuart Frankel and The Frankel Family Wing of the museum, at 525 South State Street. In October 2020, it was deinstalled since it was a long-term loan that had been bought by a private collector.

== History ==
Di Suvero created Shang in 1984–1985, and originally titled it Gateway.

It was loaned to UMMA as a long-term loan in 2008. Previously, it has been on display at the Storm King Art Center. In 2007, it was briefly on display in Millennium Park, alongside Orion and three other di Suvero pieces.

== Description ==
Shang is 25 feet tall, 19 feet wide, and 7 feet, 8 inches deep, and is made of steel. It is a functional swing that guests are permitted to climb on.

Grace Glueck, writing for the New York Times in 2005, described Shang as an "unusually solemn, surprisingly symmetrical piece in black, it stands on two sturdy legs with an arch between them that supports a broad vertical beam. It reveals little of the di Suvero exuberance but makes an imposing gateway."
