= Burnham Pavilions =

Public sculptures

Coordinates: 41°52′53.9″N 87°37′22.4″W

As the sun goes down, the Pavilions are lit in a variety of colors.

The Burnham Pavilions were public sculptures by Zaha Hadid and Ben van Berkel in Millennium Park, which were located in the Loop community area of Chicago, Illinois. Both pavilions were located in the Chase Promenade South. Their purpose was to commemorate the 100th anniversary of Daniel Burnham's Plan of Chicago, and symbolize the city's continued pursuit of the Plan's architectural vision with contemporary architecture and planning. The sculptures were privately funded and reside in Millennium Park. The pavilions were designed to be temporary structures.

Both Pavilions were scheduled to be unveiled on June 19, 2009. However, the Pavilion by Hadid endured construction delays and a construction team change, which led to nationwide coverage of the delay in publications such as The New York Times and The Wall Street Journal. Only its skeleton was availed to the public on the scheduled date, and the work was completed and unveiled on August 4, 2009. The van Berkel pavilion endured a temporary closure due to unanticipated wear and tear from August 10–14.

== Details ==
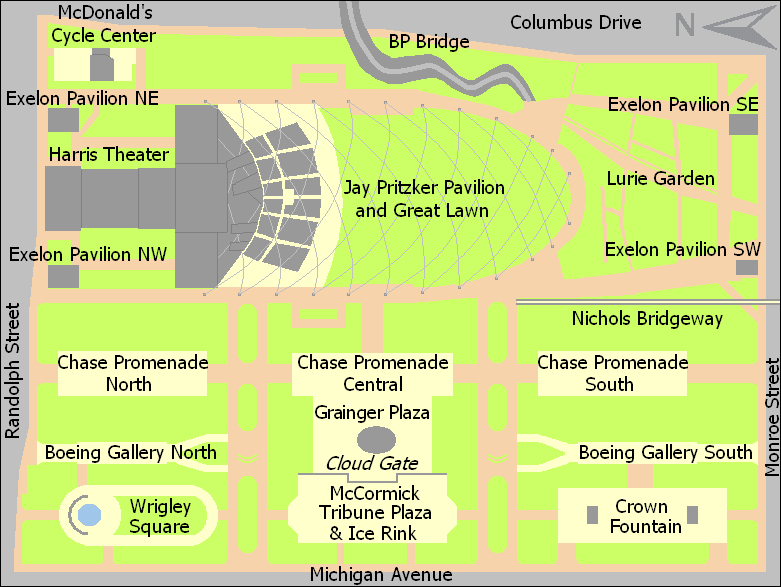
Image map of Millennium Park; east is at the top. Each feature or label is linked.

In June 2008, there was an announcement that the pavilions would be constructed. The pavilions were commissioned by the Burnham Plan Centennial Committee, a group of civic leaders who collaborated closely with the City of Chicago Department of Cultural Affairs, the Art Institute of Chicago, and Millennium Park Inc. On April 7, 2009, the designs were unveiled for the pavilions set to open on June 19 and to continue on display on the south end of the Chase Promenade until October 31. Delays were caused as a result of manufacturing. This may cause the pavilions to stay on exhibit until November. Additionally, the Hadid Pavilion may be situated in a different part of the park for part of 2010. The choices of Hadid and van Berkel were somewhat controversial because Burnham was a classicist and they are both avant-garde modernists. Additionally, local architects complained that it was a bit of a slight that two European architects were chosen to produce works to serve as the focal points of the Burnham Plan Centennial celebration. The pavilions were scheduled to be a focal point of the centennial celebration of the 1909 Plan of Chicago, which is a yearlong celebration. However, Hadid's Pavilion encountered manufacturer's difficulty in executing Hadid's complex, computer-aided design.

=== The Hadid Pavilion ===
The pavilion by Hadid, the first woman to win the Pritzker Prize, is a tensioned fabric shell fitted over a curving aluminum framework exceeding 7,000 pieces. Although the frame is composed of 7,000 individually bent pieces, no two of which are alike, the shell is made up of a mere 24 custom-made panels of fabric. As expected it accommodates a centennial-themed, audio and video presentation on its interior fabric walls. Its opening was originally expected to be delayed until at least mid-July 2009. The themed presentation that portrays Chicago's transformation as a result of Burnham's plan is by London-based, Chicago-trained filmmaker Thomas Gray. It is accompanied by a multi-channel soundtrack created by Chicago's Lou Mallozzi of Experimental Sound Studio. The pavilion is described as resembling a "futuristic camping tent". Hadid conceptualized how tension alters appearance as fabric is pulled taut or twisted, which resulted in the elliptical structure and its strategic light-availing gashes and pod-like openings for visitors to experience. The diagonal lines in the structure are a reflection of Burnham's 1909 city plan, which envisioned a fanned grid of streets emanating diagonally from Chicago's city center out into the suburbs.

Zaha Hadid's Pavilion, still under construction, opening weekend June 2009

Hadid's pavilion was depicted by a banner during the opening weekend

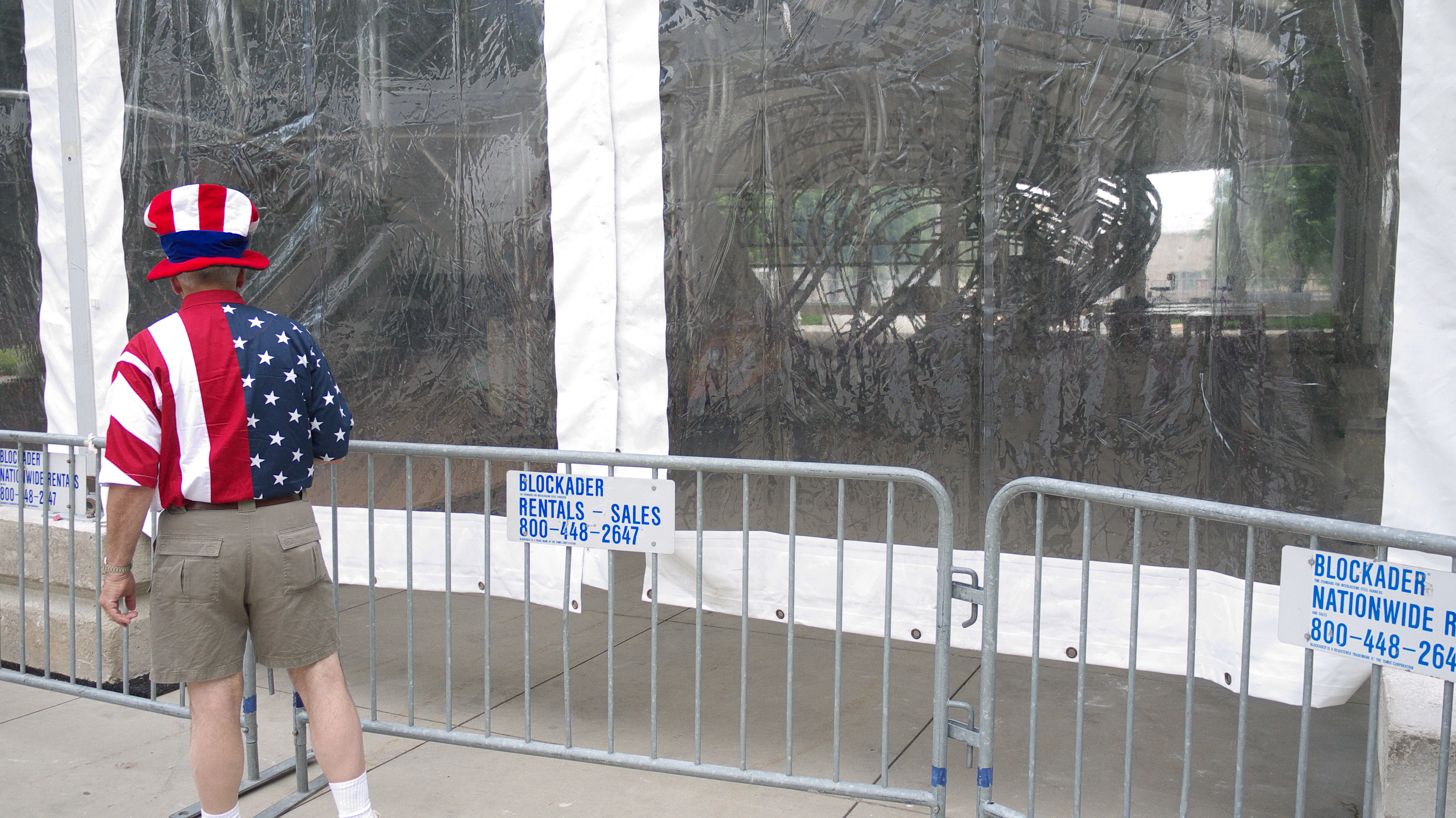
Hadid's Pavilion inside a tent.

The project was daunting in its physical complexity. TenFab Design, a tensioned fabric trade-show booth design company from Evanston, Illinois, worked nearly five months with numerous structural engineers on plans before construction could begin. As an example the inclusion of a 400-pound (180 kg) projector challenged the dynamics of the lightweight structure. The centennial committee initiated discussions with TenFab in November 2008 at which time the company requested a six-month design and assembly schedule, but the company was not hired until late February 2009. The expected completion fell behind schedule.

In July, construction responsibilities were passed from TenFab Design to a Fabric Images, an Elgin, Illinois-based company, and the anticipated opening was delayed until August 1, and the new contract has penalties for delays beyond that date. As the construction costs of the privately funded project ballooned from $500,000 to $650,000 due to the change in materials and contractors, the difference was compensated for by a shift in funds from the advertising budget. The unfinished work was visible for the opening weekend on June 19, but the following Monday it was tented while being completed. Eventually, a canvas stretched across the frame to form a structure that resembled a cocoon.

On July 20, the fabric began being formed around the aluminum shell while it remained in the tent, and although construction was expected to be completed on August 1, the opening was not anticipated at that time due to both weekend crowds and the cost of disassembling the tent on the weekend. The weekday opening should allow officials a better opportunity to gauge the wear and tear on the structure by visitors. What eventually amounted to over 1,600 yards (1,500 m) of fabric was stitched and fitted by over a dozen workers. It opened to the public on August 4 as rescheduled. Upon the completion of the temporary exhibition, the pavilion will be deeded to the city to lend or rent out to other cities. It is not designed to withstand snow loads of a Chicago winter. The pavilion is made of aluminum, donated by Marmon/Keystone Industries, a member of the Marmon Group, and a tensile fabric.

The current pavilion is not Hadid's original design, which had a greater emphasis an angularity and incorporated hard surfaces of wood and aluminum. When the committee sent the original proposal out for bid "it was way over budget." Hadid eventually submitted a new cost-conscious design of a cloth shell supported by aluminum ribs of different sizes. The pavilion's inner walls were planned to serve as projection surfaces for a film about Chicago by Gray.

Hadid had previously been commissioned to a temporary pavilion for the London's Serpentine Gallery in 2000. The pavilion was such a success that the gallery has added annual temporary pavilions every year since. Architects such as Frank Gehry and artists like Olafur Eliasson have attempted to achieve the same success in the subsequent years. She also created a mobile temporary work for Chanel that was displayed in Hong Kong, Tokyo and New York in 2008. Hadid will design the London Aquatics Centre for the 2012 Summer Olympics and the Guangzhou Opera House in China.

The Chicago Tribune's Pulitzer Prize-winning architecture critic Blair Kamin spoke glowingly of the pavilion upon its August 4, 2009, completion, describing it as "a virtuoso display of structure, space and light" with an "arresting combination of naturalistic forms and alien shapes, plus a dazzling video installation". He notes that pavilion resembles a conch shell with openings like shark's mouths. By daylight the pavilion is enticing, but the use of sunlight limits the multimedia duality to dusk and until the park's closing, when the 7.5 minute video is able to be seen on the pavilion's inner surface. He felt that the pavilion succeeded in enticing the viewer to envision a better future for Chicago in a manner like Burnham did himself. Kamin is very wary of the public's likelihood of damaging the pavilion. His concerns were born out quickly as stanchions were required to curb human nature.

=== The van Berkel Pavilion ===
Ben van Berkel's Pavilion

The pavilion opened on time in June

By August, it had to be closed temporarily

The pavilion by van Berkel of UNStudio, referred to by some as the UNStudio pavilion, is composed of two parallel rectangular planes joined by curving scoops. It is built on a steel frame and has a skin of glossy white plywood that starts off in familiar right angles and that graduates into double curves of bent plywood. It is situated on a raised platform and it hosts a grid of 42 computer-controlled, LED lights on the underside of the roof. The floor slab is cantilevered and is sliced by a ramp entrance making it ADA accessible. The roof, which is described as floating, also has eye-like openings. The pavilion is composed of steel donated by Chicago-based ArcelorMittal and is intended to be de-constructed and recycled.

The pavilion did not prove to be durable enough for the interactive environment of Millennium Park. Kamin feels that the Pavilion was designed more for veneration like indoor museum works of art and outdoor sculpture on pedestals. However, skateboarders, avid fireworks spectators and youthful climbers have been part of the multiple causation of the decline of the pavilion that led to its closure during the week of August 10–14.

== Related events ==
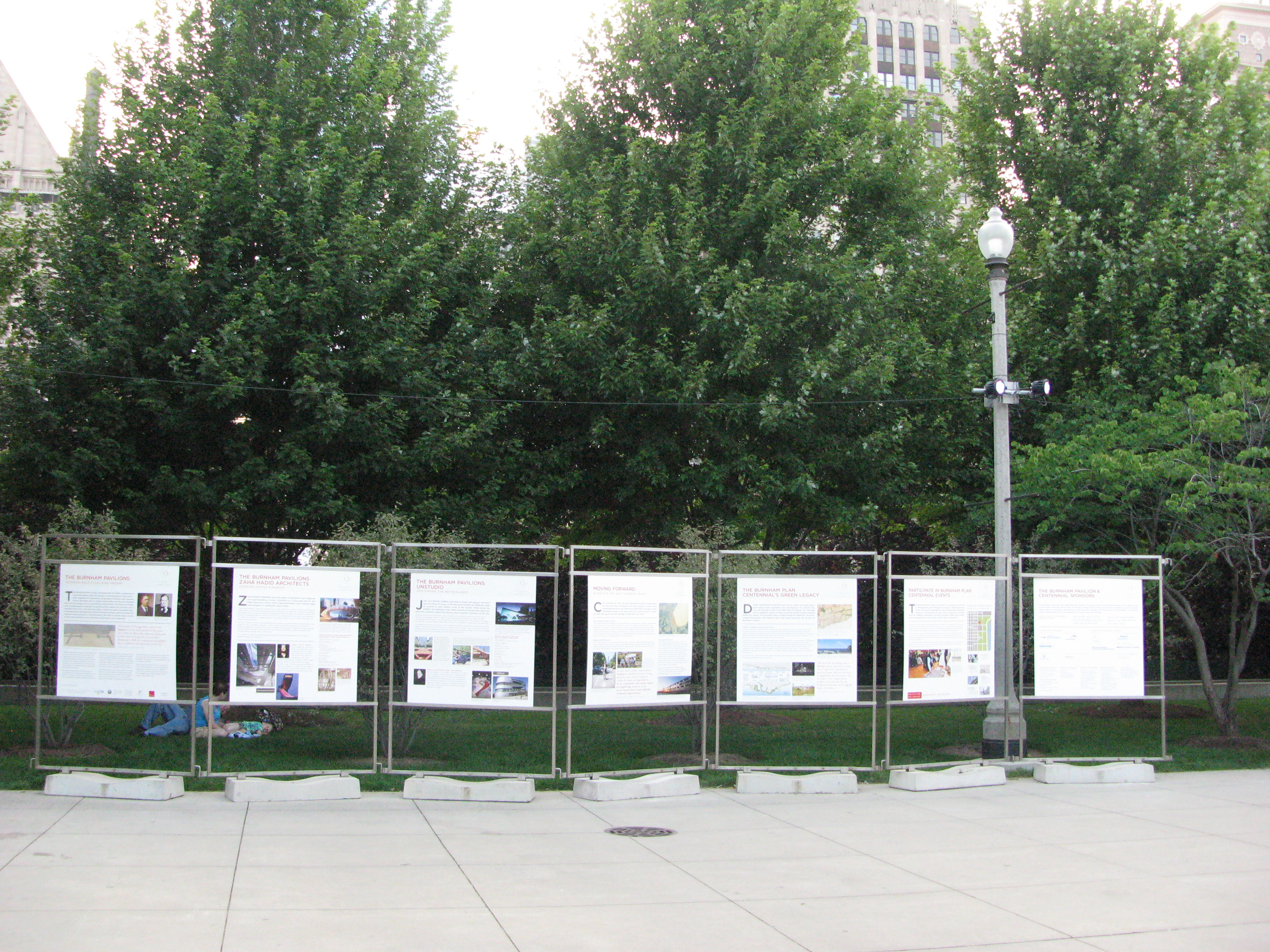
Exhibits accompanied the pavilions

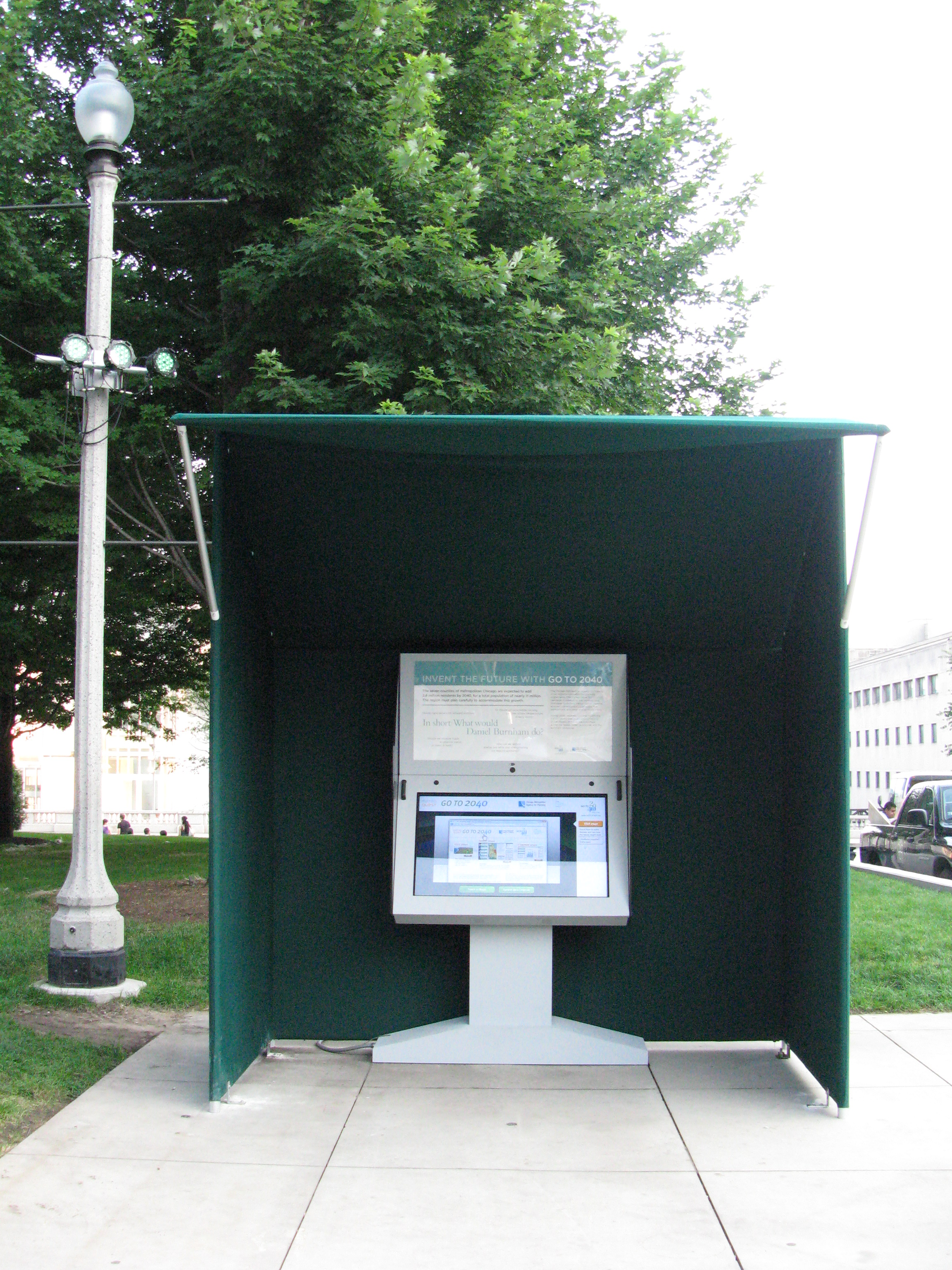
A touch screen kiosk

The Burnham Plan is credited with guiding the transformation of the city from an industrial center to leading contemporary city. The Wall Street Journal describes the plan as unrivaled in its elegance and ambition for urban planning and describes Chicago as a monumental manifestation of the plan. The unveiling of the Pavilions was part of a June 19 citywide centennial celebration that included concerts by the Grant Park Orchestra, directed by Carlos Kalmar. The concert featured the world premiere of Michael Torke's symphony and chorus work entitled Plans, that was paired with Rachmaninoff's Piano Concerto No. 3. The ongoing celebration includes lectures, walking tours and art exhibitions throughout the calendar year. The pavilions are accompanied by exhibit panels that promote the Burnham Plan Centennial celebration and continuing opportunities to pursue the plan's vision for Metropolitan Chicago. The pavilions serve as a focal point for the public's attention to steer them toward the hundreds of exhibits, events, and other activities of the more than 250 Centennial Program Partners in the Chicago metropolitan area. The ground near the pavilions host an interactive touch-screen public kiosk installation geared toward "inventing the future" of the metropolitan Chicago region.
