= Orion (sculpture) =

2006 Mark di Suvero sculpture

Orion is a public art work by artist Mark di Suvero located at the University of Michigan Museum of Art in Ann Arbor, Michigan. The sculpture is an abstract form; it is installed on the lawn in front of the museum, at 525 South State Street.

== Description ==
The sculpture is composed of juxtaposed steel elements, painted bright red-orange. It is named for the Greek mythological hunter Orion, and stands at 53 feet tall and 21,220 pounds.

== History ==
Orion was created in 2006, and was first on display at Chicago's Millennium Park. It first arrived at UMMA as a long-term loan in 2008, helping to celebrate the museum's new Maxine and Stuart Frankel and the Frankel Family Wing. In April 2018 it was removed in preparation for stormwater system repairs nearby, and was sent back to di Suvero's studio for a fresh coat of paint. In 2019, UMMA purchased Orion, and it was reinstalled. Di Suvero visited UMMA for the reinstallation, and the University of Michigan awarded him an honorary Doctor of Fine Arts degree.
