= Hoos =

Hoos is a surname. Notable people with the surname include:

- Jan de Witte (bishop), 16th century
- Edward Hoos (born 1850), former mayor of Jersey City
- Robert John Hoos (born 1876), tax commissioner
- Fred Hoos (born 1953), Canadian hockey player
- Herbert Hoos (born 1965), German footballer
- Steffen Hoos (born 1968), German biathlete
- Holger H. Hoos (born 1969), German-Canadian computer scientist
- Laurien Hoos (born 1983), Dutch athlete

== See also ==
- Hoo (disambiguation)
