= Siedler =

Surname list

Siedler is a surname. Notable people with the surname include:

- Charles Siedler (1839–1921), German-American politician, 20th Mayor of Jersey City, New Jersey
- Gerold Siedler (born 1933), German physical oceanographer
- Norbert Siedler (born 1982), Austrian racing driver
- Sebastian Siedler (born 1978), former racing cyclist from Germany
- Wolf Jobst Siedler (1926–2013), German publisher and writer
