= Romar =

Romar may refer to

- Romar (surname)
- Romar Entertainment, a California-based film distribution company
- Romar Frank (born 1996), Grenadian footballer
- Rohrbach Romar, a German long-range commercial flying-boat
