= John Longo =

American academic and author

- John M. Longo (right) presenting Warren Buffett with a gift on behalf of Rutgers Business School
- Education: Rutgers University
- Occupation: Economist

John M. Longo is an American academic, business executive, and author. He is a distinguished professor of finance at Rutgers Business School.

== Early life and education ==
He received his PhD/MBA in finance from Rutgers University in 1995.

== Career ==
Since 1993 Longo has been Professor of Finance at Rutgers Business School where he taught courses in Portfolio Management, Asset Pricing & Portfolio Analysis, Security Analysis & Trading, Applied Portfolio Management, Overview of Financial Markets, and Corporate Finance.

In March 1997 Longo was also a vice president at Merrill Lynch & Co. where he created and managed investment strategies for Merrill Lynch's Strategy Power product.

Since 2002 Longo has been chief investment officer and portfolio manager at Beacon Trust, a registered investment advisor with approximately $2.5 billion in assets under management. Beacon Trust is a unit of Provident Financial Services and took over The MDE Group, a New Jersey–based wealth management firm where Longo was chief investment officer. He also co-authors many of the firms white papers and speaks on behalf of the firm around the country.

== Editorial work and authorship ==
He is the author/editor of Hedge Fund Alpha: A Framework for Generating and Understanding Investment Performance, which was published in March 2009. The book focuses on generating and understanding investment performance for hedge funds and examines the emerging markets of Brazil, Russia, India and China.
