= Edwin Manners =

American lawyer

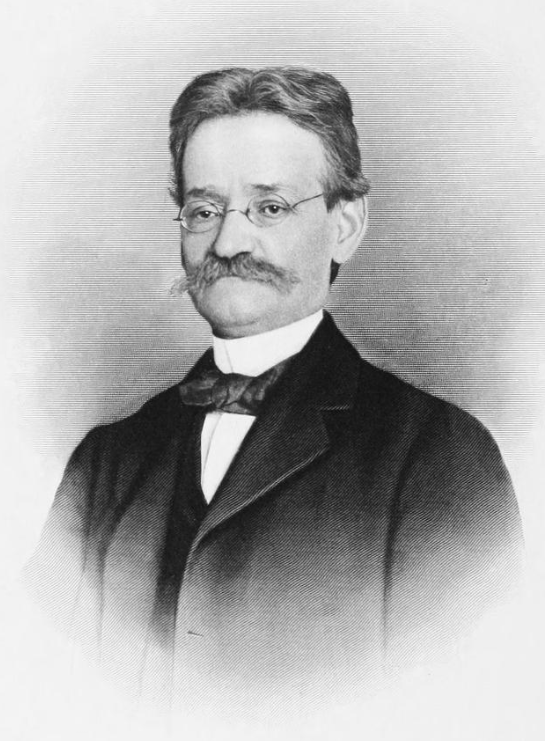
- Born: March 6, 1855; Jersey City, New Jersey
- Died: May 4, 1913 (aged 58); Jersey City, New Jersey
- Education: Princeton University; Columbia University
- Occupation: Lawyer

Edwin Manners (March 6, 1855 – May 4, 1913) was an American lawyer, property owner and diarist. He graduated from Princeton University with a Bachelor of Arts in 1877, went on to earn a degree in Law at Columbia University, and was accepted to the bar. He became involved in projects to improve Jersey City, such as a project improving the water supply. He continued as a lawyer, besides his municipal interests, and spent a good deal of time managing his property. He also kept a journal detailing his life over a 21-year period, from 1893 to 1913.

He is the son of the Mayor of Jersey City David Stout Manners and Deborah Philips Johnes. The American branch, which emigrated to America about 1700, is connected with the noble family of Manners in England.

During his senior year at Princeton University he was one of the editors of the Nassau Literary Magazine.^{OCLC 2232539}

A Manners Fund created under Manners' will continues to "provide support for advanced fellowships in the fields of English and history" at Princeton University.

== Family history ==
Edwin Manners, A.M., LL.B., was the son of the late Hon. David Stout Manners and Deborah Philips Johnes, and was born in Jersey City, N. J., on March 6, 1855. His father was for several terms Mayor of Jersey City and universally esteemed and respected as one of its best executives and citizens. He is a grandson of David Manners, a great-grandson of John Manners, and a great-great-grandson of John Manners, Sr., of Yorkshire, England, who was born in 1678, emigrated to America about 1700, and married Rebecca Stout, of Middletown, N. J., a granddaughter of Richard and Penelope Van Princess Stout, of interesting memory, and the first in America. John Manners, Sr., settled at Upper Freehold, N. J., but afterward moved to Amwell, Hunterdon County, in this State, where he died in 1770. The American branch is connected with the noble family of Manners in England, which traces its distinguished lineage back to the time of William the Conqueror, and indeed is of Norman origin.

On his mother's side Edwin Manners was a grandson of David Johnes, a great-grandson of David Johnes, Sr., a great-great-grandson of Stephen Johnes, and a great-great-great-grandson of Samuel Johnes, Jr., who was the son of Samuel Johnes, Sr., whose father, Edward Johnes, of Somerset, England, carne to Charlestown (Boston), Mass., with (governor Winthrop in 1630); he later was one of the founders of Southampton, Long Island, and died there in 1659. Edward married Anne, daughter of George and Alice Griggs, natives of binder. The Johnes family in the United States may be distantly related to that of Dolan Cothi, in Wales, which traces to Godebog, King of Britain, but is directly descended from the Johnes family of County Berks. County Salop, and London and Somerset, England, the branches living in those counties and also in Bristol all proceeding from the same original stock. Sir Francis Johnes was Lord Mayor of London in 1620. Edwin Manners's great-grandfather, John Schenck, was a Captain in the Revolutionary War, took an active part in the principal battles in the State, and by a well-planned ambuscade prevented the British troops from overrunning Hunterdon County.

His grandfather, David -Manners, who married Captain Schenck's daughter Mary, was an officer in the War of 1812, and won honorable mention in several important engagements. On the maternal side Mr. Manners's great-great-grandfather, Stephen Johnes, married Grace Fitz Randolph, whose brother Nathaniel gave to Princeton the land upon which Nassau Hall is erected, and his great-grandfather, David Johnes, was a Major in the Revolution and rendered efficient service in establishing American independence.

Edwin Manners died in Jersey City on May 4, 1913.

== University life ==
In the "Fifty Years of Princeton" written in 1927 about the class of '77 - Henry Fairfield Osborn had this to say about Edwin:

This was the portraiture by Jacobus in his Memorial Address of 1917. Judge Manners had written for the Record of 1907 : "I have enough serious work to do and sufficient leisure. My health is good and I hold myself well in hand with an eye on various tangents. I am fond of horseback riding, but my pet horses are dead. I amuse myself with letters and social diversions." Ten years earlier he had written that he rode a Luthy bicycle and a Blackwood mare. So the life of '77's presentation orator who spoke so eloquently at the Cannon Exercises on Class Day, is pictured distinctly. Jersey City was continuously the scene of his activities after he left Princeton. From 1884 his time was largely occupied with the management of his father's estate. Judge Manners never married. He died on May 4, 1913.

His suggestions for the improvement of Princeton were written for the Records of 1887 and 1897. They are respectively:

1. Let the Alumni elect Alumni to the Board of Trustees.

2. Add more distinguished professors to the Faculty. I have no faith in the theory that dull men are better teachers than bright men.

3. Build a university theatre or music hall.

4. Establish a university printing press.

5. Found a lectureship on literature, the incumbent to be elected annually by ballot by the entire body of the students, and deliver a series of lectures to be published and known as 'Princeton Lectures on Literature.' The lecturer to be chosen from among men of letters outside the college. Besides the intrinsic worth and influence of such a lectureship it would lend to the college an adjurant prestige and popular interest hardly equalled by the lord rectorship at Scottish universities.

In 1897:

Of modern languages, Spanish is amongst those least cultivated, yet, to Americans, it is of living concern and greatest practical advantage. This is plainly indicated by the increasing importance of our country's relations with Spanish America. It is expedient, therefore, to bring Spanish to the fore and extend a cordial welcome to Spanish-American matriculates. It would be well if the Board of Trustees became less of a star chamber and more of a representative body of the Alumni to comport with the institution's reputation for democracy. The fine arts should be given a larger place and regard. Princeton commendably makes for strength of character, but too little seemingly for grace and beauty. Perhaps it is not invidious to suggest that the literary department might be strengthened by the addition of some critic or author who speaks with authority, if forsooth any man of letters can be found at present who speaks with much authority. A law school should be established directly, and I believe there is a sufficient demand for it. Revive boating,... laurels could be won in aquatics with the means now at command. With Stony Brook enlarged to Stony River, the facilities for success will be ample. Sports on the water attract.

== "Gold Badges for writers" ==
Included in his bequest to Princeton and Columbia Universities, Manners set up three different scholarship awards "to be used annually for the advancement of literary and historical studies".

The first award mentioned in his last will and testament is the Golden Violet, to be given to the student "who produced the best piece of literary work, whether in prose or in verse..."

The second award mentioned is one to be given to the student "who shall write the best monograph on the history of New Jersey or on some City, town or institution thereof or subject connected therewith, and the recipient of this award is to be known as the Neo Caesarean Scholar."

The last award he provides for in his will is intended for the student "who shall write the best character study or descriptive sketch, whether it be in prose or in verse.. the successful candidate is to be designated as the Winner of the Golden Tiger." Manners also prescribes that some of his bequest be used "in the making of an artistic golden violet, to be worn as a badge". To accompany the Golden Tiger award, Manners also provided for "the purchase or making of a golden tiger, in the style of an emblem and designed by an artist."

=== Known winners of Princeton University's Golden Tiger Award ===
- 1917: Sam Shoemaker, Jr.
- 1918: John Peale Bishop, Richard Henry Ritter (honorable mention)
- 1919: James Creese, Jr,
- 1920: no award listed
- 1921: Edward Van Dyke Wight, Jr.
- 1922: Ralph Edward Kent
- 1923: no award listed
- 1924: John Stuart Martin, Donald Alfred Stauffer
- 1925: William Bradford Hubbell, Charles Edward Boynton (h.m.)
- 1926: James Alan Montgomery, Jr.
- 1927: no award listed
- 1928: Walter Critz Watkins, James Burnham (h.m.)
- 1929: Harold Allison Rue
- 1930: Frank Callan Norris
- 1931: John Mason Bradbury
- 1932: William Main Doerflinger, Basil Beya (h.m.)
- 1933: Alexander Hamilton Leighton, William Piel, Jr. (h.m.)
- 1934: Robert Elwood NHail, Jr.
- 1935: Philip Clark Horton
- 1936: Robert Henry Super, James Avery Worden (h.m.)
- 1937: Charles Edward Shain, Alba Houghton Warren, Jr. (h.m.)
- 1938: no award listed
- 1939: Desideri Xavier Parreno, Burrowes Hunt (h.m.)
- 1940: no award listed
- 1941: George A. Hamid, Jr.
- 1942: Herbert Smith Bailey, Jr., John Nixon Brooks, Jr. (h.m.)
- 1943: Joseph Deéricks Bennet, Thomas Herndon (h.m.)
- 1944-47: no awards listed
- 1948: Frederick Buechner, Ernest Stock (h.m.)
- 1949: no award listed
- 1950: Charles William Slack, John Murphy Scott (h.m.)
- 1951: Robert V. Keeley
- 1952: Roy Frederick Lawrence, George Basil Lambrakis (h.m.)
- 1953: John McPhee
- 1952-55: no award listed
- 1956: Kurth Sprague
- 1957: Carl Wilhelm Haffenreffer, Jr., Robert McConkie Rehder (h.m.)
- 1958: no award listed
- 1959: Charlton Reynders, Jr., Thomas Sanford James (h.m.)
- 1960: Lauren Rogers Stevens, David Vickers Forrest (h.m.)
- 1961: Roy Neil Graves, II Mark Allen Rose (h.m.)
- 1962: David F. Thorburn
- 1963: George Webb Constable
- 1964–present: no mention of award

=== Known winners of Princeton's Neo-Caesarean Scholar Award ===
- 1921: Nolan Bailey Harmon, Jr.
- 1922-24: no award listed
- 1925: K. C. Wu
- 1926: Benjamin Burnis Shipman
- 1927: Pinckney Alston Waring
- 1928-34: no award listed
- 1935: Ransom Elwood Noble, Jr.
- 1936-47: no award listed
- 1948: Nathan Adams and Kenneth Walbridge Condit
- 1949-52: no award listed
- 1953: Jack Richon Pole

=== Known winners of Columbia University's Golden Violet ===
- 1931: Bascom Lamar Lunsford (awarded Princeton funds in this year to record Appalachian Heritage Music)
