= Mark M. Fagan =

American politician (1869–1955)

Mark Matthew Fagan
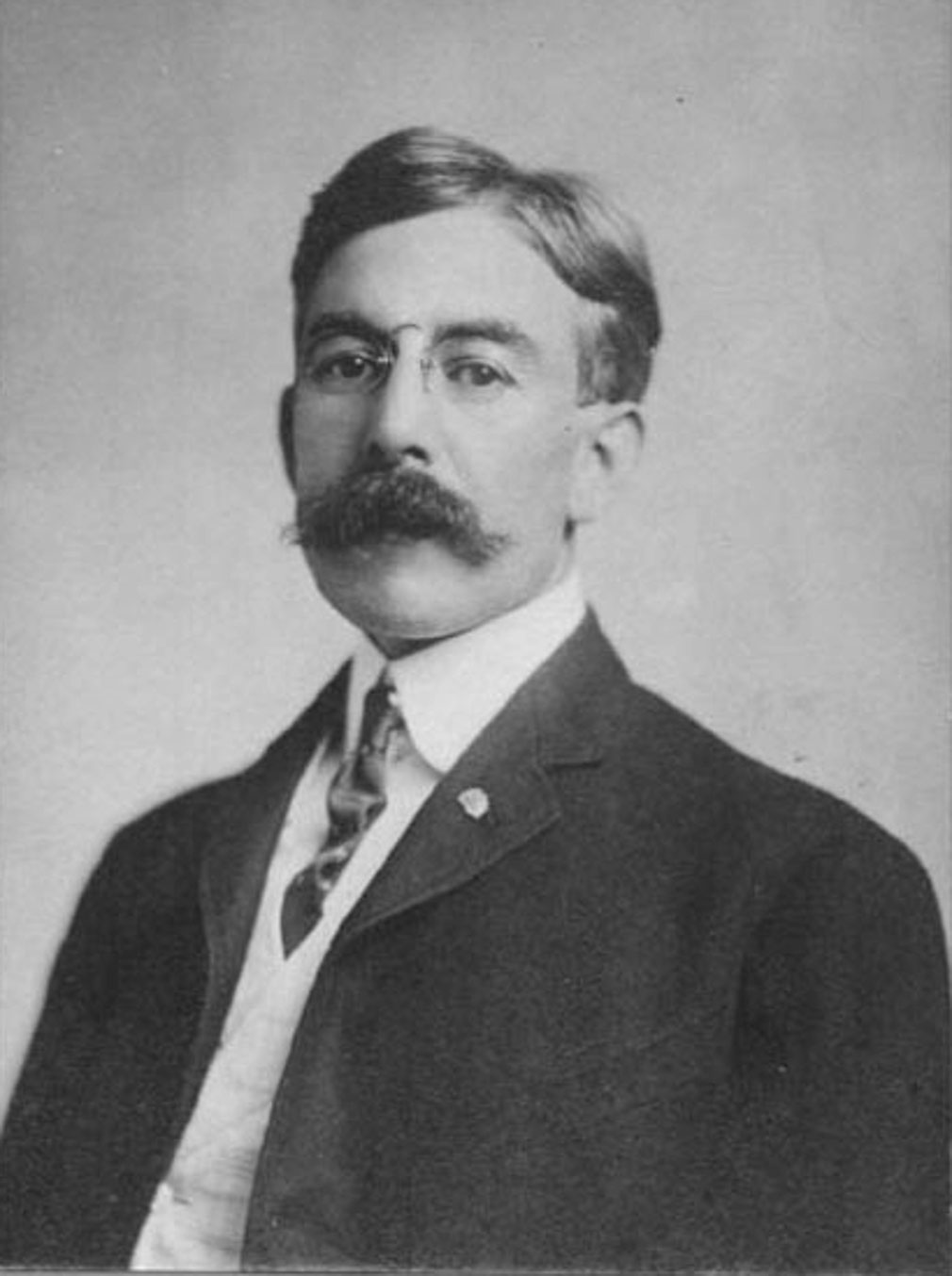

27th and 29th Mayor of Jersey City
- In office 1902–1907
- Preceded by: Edward Hoos
- Succeeded by: H. Otto Wittpenn
- In office 1913–1917
- Preceded by: H. Otto Wittpenn
- Succeeded by: Frank Hague

Personal details
- Born: September 29, 1869 Jersey City, New Jersey
- Died: July 16, 1955 (aged 85) Jersey City, New Jersey
- Party: Independent Democrat; Republican

Mark Matthew Fagan (September 29, 1869 – July 16, 1955) was an Irish Catholic mayor of Jersey City, New Jersey, United States, from 1902 to 1907 and 1913 to 1917.

== Biography ==
He was born on September 29, 1869, in Jersey City. He had little formal education, and as a youth, he worked for his uncle as an undertaker. A Republican, he entered politics while still in his twenties becoming a county freeholder though he was not re-elected.

In 1901, Republican Party boss, Colonel Samuel D. Dickinson, asked him to run for mayor, which Fagan did and won becoming the 27th mayor of Jersey City. At age 32, he was the youngest mayor elected in Jersey City until that time and only the fifth Republican. He was re-elected for three consecutive two-year terms however, after feuding with his own party, he was defeated for re-election in 1907 by H. Otto Wittpenn. He unsuccessfully ran again in 1909.

In 1913, Jersey City went to a city commission form of government, and Fagan was elected commissioner. He was then chosen by his colleagues to be mayor once more. As mayor, he was famous for building schools. In 1917, he stepped down as mayor, retired from politics and continued his career as an undertaker.

Political boss Frank Hague succeeded him as mayor. It would be 75 years before another Republican, Bret Schundler, would be elected mayor of Jersey City.

Fagan died on July 16, 1955, and was buried in Holy Name Cemetery in Jersey City.

== See also ==
- List of mayors of Jersey City, New Jersey
