= Romar (surname) =

Romar is a surname. Notable people with the surname include:

- Andreas Romar (born 1989), Finnish alpine skier
- John B. Romar (c. 1825–1892), American mayor
- Lorenzo Romar (born 1958), American basketball coach and former player
