= Peter McMartin =

American politician (1805–1870)

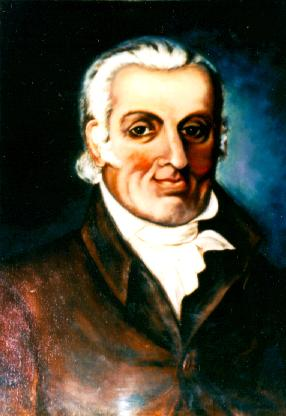

2nd Mayor of Jersey City
- In office April 1840 – April 1841
- Preceded by: Dudley S. Gregory
- Succeeded by: Dudley S. Gregory

Personal details
- Born: May 11, 1805 New York, U.S.
- Died: after 1870
- Spouse: Harriet Lyon

Peter McMartin (born May 11, 1805) was an American politician. He was the second Mayor of Jersey City, New Jersey.

== Biography ==
When Jersey City was incorporated as a municipality on February 22, 1838, McMartin was a member of the first Common Council. He succeeded Dudley S. Gregory as mayor two years later. He served a single one-year term from April 1840 to April 1841. He was succeeded by Gregory. He served as Jersey City freeholder in 1847 and 1848.

On November 16, 1830, Martin married Harriet Lyon at St. Matthew's Episcopal Church in Jersey City.
