= Gilbert Collins =

American judge

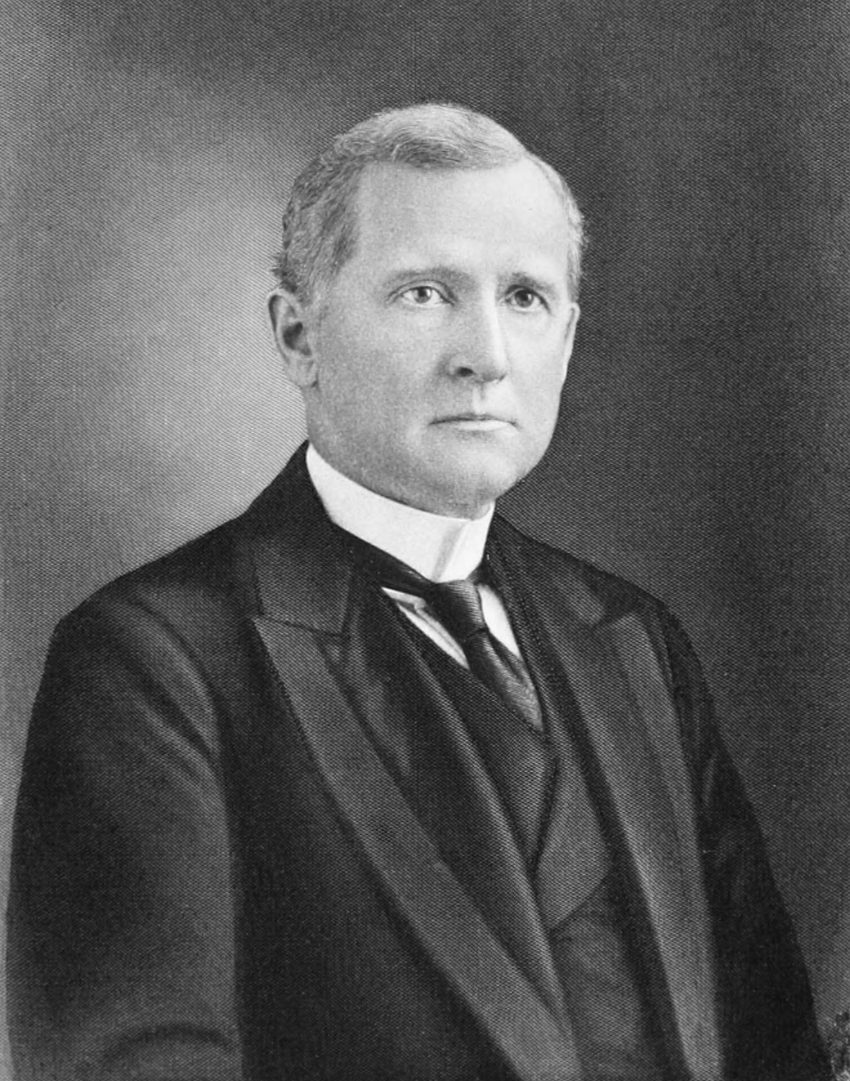

Associate Justice of the Supreme Court of New Jersey
- In office 1897–1903
- Appointed by: John W. Griggs

23rd Mayor of Jersey City
- In office May 5, 1884 – May 2, 1886
- Preceded by: Isaac W. Taussig
- Succeeded by: Orestes Cleveland

Personal details
- Born: August 26, 1846 Stonington, Connecticut
- Died: January 29, 1920 (aged 73) Jersey City, New Jersey
- Party: Republican
- Other political affiliations: Citizens Association (1884)
- Spouse: Harriet Kingsbury Bush (m. 1870)
- Children: 6
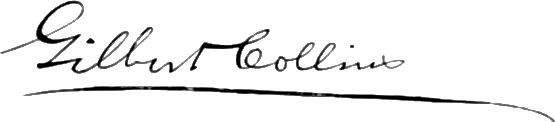
- Signature

Gilbert Collins (August 25, 1846 – January 29, 1920) was an American jurist and Republican Party politician from New Jersey who served as the mayor of Jersey City from 1884 to 1886.

== Early life and education ==
Gilbert Collins was born on August 25, 1846, in Stonington, Connecticut to Daniel Prentice and Sarah R. Collins. His paternal ancestors immigrated from England and resided in New London, Connecticut prior to 1710. His father owned a manufacturing business with extensive interests in Stonington and Jersey City, New Jersey.

Collins was attending Yale University when his father died in 1862, leaving him a small inheritance. He withdrew from Yale to care for his family, and they relocated to Jersey City.

== Legal and business career ==
In Jersey City, Collins read law with rising lawyer Jonathan Dixon. He began practicing in 1869 as Dixon's law partner, and their partnership continued until Dixon was appointed to the Supreme Court of New Jersey by Joseph D. Bedle in 1875. Collins formed a new partnership with Charles L. Corbin in 1875 which continued until Corbin's death, when Collins partnered with Corbin's brother, William H. Corbin. Collins & Corbin was dissolved during Collins's service as a judge but re-established after his resignation. William H. Corbin died and Collins was joined by several junior partners, including William H. Corbin's son. As of 1917, it was considered one of the busiest law firms in New Jersey.

As an attorney, Collins was involved in a number of important cases interpreting the 1875 amendments to the Constitution of New Jersey and a decades-long dispute over Sussex County zinc mining. In 1894, he represented the Republican members-elect of the New Jersey Senate who sued to vindicate their election after the incumbent Democratic senators barred the doors of the Senate chambers against them.

Outside of his legal practice, as of 1917 Collins served as a member of the board of directors of the Hudson County National Bank, the New Jersey Title Guarantee & Trust Company, Prudential Insurance Company of America, and the Chapultapec Land Improvement Company, a real estate development firm based in Mexico City.

== Political and judicial career ==
For many years, Collins was the leading figure in the Republican Party of Hudson County, which was dominated by the rival Democratic Party. In 1880, he ran unsuccessfully for New Jersey Senate, one of many quixotic campaigns for state senate or United States House of Representatives. He also served as a delegate to the 1892 Republican National Convention and was an unsuccessful Republican candidate for presidential elector in 1912.

=== Mayor of Jersey City (1884–86) ===
On March 25, 1884, Collins was nominated for mayor of Jersey City on the Citizens Association ticket. He was also nominated by the city Republicans. Despite the strong Democratic lean of the city, Collins easily defeated John D. McGill by 3,250 votes.

As mayor, Collins reasserted the city's right to the South Cove basin, defeating claims by the state of New Jersey and the American Dock & Improvement Company, which operated the land, that a prior land grant from the state to the city had been revoked by non-acceptance. During the litigation between Jersey City and American Dock & Improvement, Collins personally participated as counsel on behalf of the city. He also appeared in a professional capacity to represent various municipalities against railroad companies, which led to the passage of the state Railroad Tax Act of 1884.

=== Supreme Court of New Jersey (1897–1903) ===
On March 2, 1897, Governor John W. Griggs appointed Collins as an associate justice on the Supreme Court of New Jersey. He served alongside his former law partner, Jonathan Dixon, until Collins resigned in 1903 with one year left in his term to return to Collins & Corbin. While on the bench, his important decisions included a ruling establishing that an unconstitutional act of the New Jersey Legislature was not void but could be amended to be made constitutional, a ruling sustaining the classification of municipalities by their form of incorporation, and a ruling establishing that suicide does not vitiate a life insurance policy unless intent can be shown or it is specifically stipulated.

== Personal life and death ==
Collins was a member of the Union League and Carteret Clubs of Hudson County, the New Jersey Society of the Revolution, and the

On January 2, 1870, Collins married Harriet Kingsbury Bush in Jersey City. She died on May 15, 1917. They had six children, three of whom died in infancy. Their surviving children were Walter, Blanche, and Marjorie. Walter was an attorney practicing in Jersey City who died on November 11, 1900.

Collins died of pneumonia in his home in Jersey City on January 29, 1920. He was buried in the family vault in Hilliard Cemetery in Stonington.
