= James Gopsill =

American politician

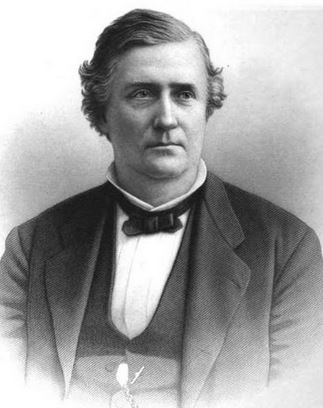

15th Mayor of Jersey City
- In office May 6, 1867 – May 3, 1868
- Preceded by: Orestes Cleveland
- Succeeded by: Charles H. O'Neill

Personal details
- Born: July 22, 1823 New York City
- Died: July 26, 1884 (aged 61) Cornwall-on-Hudson, New York
- Party: Republican
- Spouse: Rachel
- Children: Thomas Milburn Gopsill
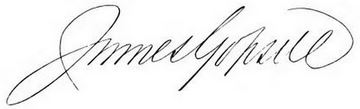
- Signature

James Gopsill (July 22, 1823 – July 26, 1884) was the fifteenth Mayor of Jersey City from May 6, 1867, to May 3, 1868.

== Biography ==
He was born in 1823 in New York City to an immigrant from England. He worked as a clerk in a dry goods store. He moved to Jersey City, New Jersey in 1840 and set up his own dry goods store. Gopsill became the president of the Hudson Insurance Company and founded the Children's Home for Orphans. In the 1860s, he began publishing city directories.

Gopsill was a delegate from New Jersey at the 1868 Republican National Convention in Chicago and a member of the Republican National Committee from New Jersey from 1868 to 1872.

He died from angina while on vacation with his wife in Cornwall-on-Hudson, New York on July 26, 1884.

== Legacy ==
He is the grandfather of Assemblyman Thomas Gopsill.

Political offices
Preceded by Orestes Cleveland	Mayor of Jersey City; 1867–1868	Succeeded by Charles H. O'Neill
