= Joseph Zito (elevator operator) =

Hero during Triangle Shirtwaist factory fire

Joseph A. Zito
- Born: Giuseppe Alessandro Maria Zito; September 1, 1883; Serre, Campania, Italy
- Died: October 22, 1932 (aged 49); Jersey City, New Jersey, U.S.
- Resting place: Bayview – New York Bay Cemetery
- Occupation: Elevator operator
- Known for: Saving over 100 lives in the Triangle Shirtwaist Factory fire
- Children: 7

Joseph A. Zito (September 1, 1883 – October 22, 1932), born Giuseppe Alessandro Maria Zito, was an Italian-American elevator operator who saved over 100 lives during the Triangle Shirtwaist Factory fire on March 25, 1911.

== Early life ==
Zito was born in Serre, Campania, Italy. He emigrated to the United States at age 19 and had been employed by the Triangle Waist Company for six months when the fire occurred.

== Triangle Fire heroism ==
During the fire at the Triangle Waist Company in Manhattan, Zito made between eight and twenty elevator trips through smoke and flames, evacuating workers from the 8th, 9th, and 10th floors. He continued operating until fire engulfed the elevator shaft, sustaining severe burns and stab wounds from scissors held by panicked workers trying to board.

Zito later recounted hearing bodies hitting the roof of his elevator car and the sound of coins from workers' pay envelopes falling through the grating. In his testimony to The New York Times, he described finding "a group of girls screaming and pressing up against the door" at the eighth floor, with factory co-owner Isaac Harris telling them to stay back and let women evacuate first.

== Aftermath and recognition ==
District Attorney Charles Seymour Whitman, who interviewed Zito at the scene, stated: "He is a hero, every inch of him." Whitman ensured Zito received medical attention for his injuries and was released from police custody.

The Charity Organization Society provided $400 to support Zito's family during his recovery. His wife suffered a miscarriage upon learning of the fire. Zito received medals from La Societa' Reduci, the Foresters of America, and the Italian government for his heroism.

== Later life and death ==
Zito's injuries left him with lifelong health problems. He died penniless at age 49, having refused bribes during the fire investigation. Four years before his death, he lost his position at the Erie Railroad Camp in Croxton, Jersey City, and remained unemployed. He was buried at Bayview – New York Bay Cemetery after funeral services attended by family, friends, and fellow members of Veritas Lodge Number 228, Free and Accepted Masons.

== Legacy ==
In 2017, his hometown of Serre, Italy, named a street "Vicolo Giuseppe Zito" in his honor. Materials related to Zito's life are preserved at Cornell University Library's Kheel Center for Labor-Management Documentation and Archives.

== See also ==
- Triangle Shirtwaist Factory fire
