= Robert G. Smith (colonel) =

American general (1854–1923)

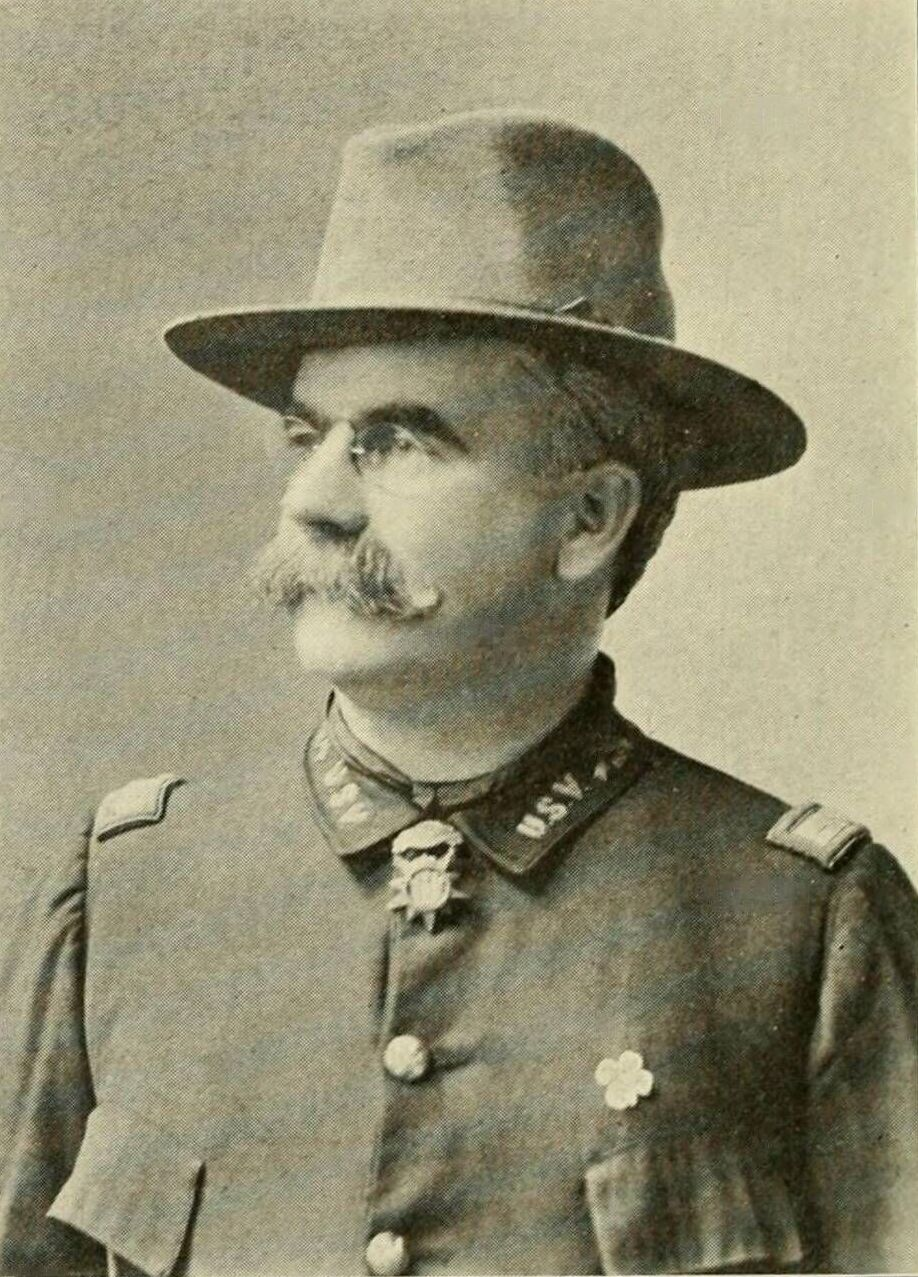
- Born: October 1854; Belfast, County Down, United Kingdom
- Died: December 5, 1923 (aged 69); Sayville, New York, U.S.
- Burial place: Bayview – New York Bay Cemetery, Jersey City, New Jersey, U.S.
- Military career
- Allegiance: United States
- Branch: New Jersey National Guard
- Service years: 1877–1906
- Rank: Colonel (Volunteers); Bvt. Brigadier General (Regular Army)
- Commands: 4th New Jersey Volunteer Infantry Regiment
- Conflicts: Spanish–American War

Robert G. Smith (1854–1923) was an Irish-born American Brevet Brigadier General of the Spanish–American War. He was known as the Colonel of the 4th New Jersey Volunteer Infantry Regiment and a notable figure during the early 20th–Century of Jersey City.

== Military career ==
Smith was born in October 1854 and shortly after, immigrated for New Jersey. He enlisted in the New Jersey National Guard on 1877 and was promoted to colonel in 1897. Upon the outbreak of the Spanish–American War, Smith enrolled to become the Colonel of the 4th New Jersey Volunteer Infantry Regiment under Adjutant General William Scudder Stryker on June 30, 1898. The regiment was mustered at Sea Girt on July 18, 1898, by Captain W. C. Buttler but the regiment saw no active service during the war and Smith was mustered out on November 3, 1898, at Camp George Meade. After the war, Smith would continue to serve in the New Jersey National Guard as a colonel until his retirement on May 17, 1906, with the rank of Brevet Brigadier General. During the nomination of his Brigadier General status by the New Jersey Legislature, Smith moved to Washington, D.C., to secure his position.

== Later careers and memberships ==
Smith would continue to gain prominence in Jersey City by becoming the president of the Board of Commissioners and Water Commissioners and served as a member of the Excise Board of Washington, D.C., on 1914. He served as a member of the Naval and Military Order of the Spanish War and the Spanish–American War Veterans. Smith was also a freemason as he served at the Lodge of Temple No. 110 at Sayville, New York and the Masonic Veterans Association at Washington, D.C. While serving as the marine superintendent of the Cunard S.S. Lines, he died at Sayville on December 5, 1923, and was buried at the Bayview – New York Bay Cemetery.

== Awards ==
- Military Order of Foreign Wars
