= Dudley S. Gregory =

First Mayor of Jersey City, New Jersey

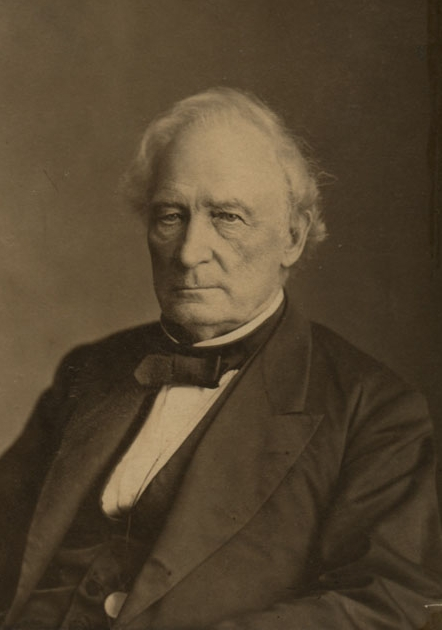

Member of the U.S. House of Representatives from New Jersey's 5th district
- In office March 4, 1847 – March 3, 1849
- Preceded by: William Wright
- Succeeded by: James G. King

1st, 3rd and 11th Mayor of Jersey City
- In office 1838 – 1840
- Preceded by: Inaugural
- Succeeded by: Peter McMartin
- In office 1841 – 1842
- Preceded by: Peter McMartin
- Succeeded by: Thomas A. Alexander
- In office 1858 – 1860
- Preceded by: Samuel Wescott
- Succeeded by: Cornelius Van Vorst

Personal details
- Born: Dudley Sanford Gregory; February 5, 1800 Redding, Connecticut, U.S.
- Died: December 8, 1874 (aged 74) Jersey City, New Jersey, U.S.
- Resting place: Green-Wood Cemetery, Brooklyn, New York; 40.652243°N 73.991321°W
- Party: Whig
- Spouse: Ann Marie Lyon
- Profession: Lottery agent

Dudley Sanford Gregory (February 5, 1800 – December 8, 1874) was the first Mayor of Jersey City, New Jersey, and was elected as a Whig to represent New Jersey's 5th congressional district in the United States House of Representatives from 1847 to 1849.

== Biography ==
Gregory was born in Redding, Connecticut, and relocated to Albany, New York as a child. He worked as a clerk in the office of the New York State Comptroller for fourteen years, and became Chief Clerk of the Canal department. Gregory was a member of the guard of honor to receive General Marquis de La Fayette on his visit to the United States in 1824. Moving to Jersey City from New York City in 1834, he became involved in politics. He was elected the first mayor of newly incorporated Jersey City in 1838 and served to 1840. During those years he simultaneously served as a member of the Bergen County Board of Chosen Freeholders. (Jersey City was in Bergen County until 1840, when Hudson County was created.) He served three separate terms as mayor, being elected again in 1841 and serving to 1842. He served three terms on the Hudson County Board of Chosen Freeholders, and was at one time a director of sixteen different railroads. Gregory was co-founder of the Provident Bank of New Jersey and was president from 1841 to 1874.

A member of the Whig Party, Gregory was elected in 1846 to the United States House of Representatives, serving one term in office from March 4, 1847 – March 3, 1849, and chose not to run for re-election. After ten years, Gregory was elected for a third term as mayor in 1858 and served to 1860. Gregory was involved in banking and railroads.

Upon returning to private business, Gregory was one of the incorporators of the "Mutual Benefit Life and Insurance Company of the County of Hudson" along with several partners including his last predecessor as mayor of Jersey City, Samuel Wescott. An original stockholder of the Adirondack Iron and Steel Works in Jersey City, Gregory bought the company in 1863. Adirondack was the oldest continually operating cast-steel works in the United States.

Gregory married Ann Marie Lyon of Albany, New York on September 10, 1822. They had 14 children; Caroline, Mary Louisa, Clara Bartlett, George Washington, Joseph, Dudley Sanford, Ann Eliza, Ann Marie, Walter, Charles Edward, Benjamin, Laura Drew, Archibald McIntyre and David Henderson.

Gregory died in his home in Jersey City, New Jersey on December 8, 1874. He was buried in Green-Wood Cemetery in Brooklyn with his wife who had died three years earlier on May 18, 1871. At the time of his death, Dudley's estate was estimated to be worth $1 million and his will provided for annual payments to be made to some of his children and grandchildren, sister-in-law, and "Adam Thompson, a colored servant."

== See also ==
- List of mayors of Jersey City, New Jersey

U.S. House of Representatives
| Preceded by William Wright | Member of the U.S. House of Representatives from New Jersey's 5th congressional district March 4, 1847 – March 3, 1849 | Succeeded by James G. King |
