= Samuel Wescott =

American politician

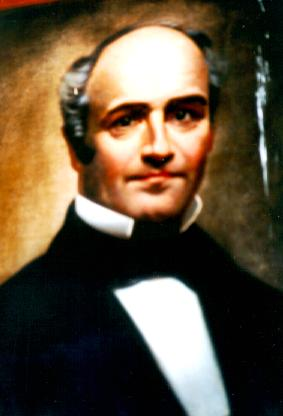

10th Mayor of Jersey City
- In office May 4, 1857 – May 2, 1858
- Preceded by: David Stout Manners
- Succeeded by: Dudley S. Gregory

Member of the New Jersey Senate from Hudson County
- In office 1860–1862
- Preceded by: Cornelius V. Clickener
- Succeeded by: Theodore Fitz Randolph

Personal details
- Party: Democratic

Samuel Wescott was an American politician. He was the tenth Mayor of Jersey City. He succeeded David Stout Manners. Wescott served a single term from May 4, 1857 to May 2, 1858. He was succeeded by Dudley S. Gregory. Wescott served in the New Jersey State Senate from 1860 to 1862.

Wescott incorporated the "Mutual Benefit Life and Insurance Company of the County of Hudson" in 1860. His partners included Dudley S. Gregory, John Van Vorst, Edmund Kingsland, Garret Sip, John M. Cornelison, Hery F. Cox, Peter Bentley, Augustus A. Hardenburgh, and Jonathan D. Miller.

Wescott donated land in Cannelton (now Darlington), Pennsylvania for the construction of St. Rose Catholic Church c. 1861
