= Peter F. Wanser =

American politician

Peter Farmer Wanser
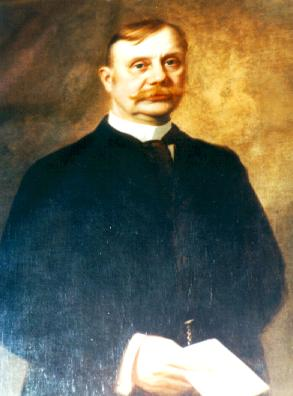

25th Mayor of Jersey City
- In office May 2, 1892 – May 2, 1897
- Preceded by: Orestes Cleveland
- Succeeded by: Edward Hoos

Personal details
- Born: January 24, 1849 near New Brunswick, New Jersey
- Died: January 3, 1918 (aged 68) Jersey City, New Jersey
- Party: Republican

Peter Farmer Wanser (January 24, 1849 – January 3, 1918) was the 25th Mayor of Jersey City, New Jersey from May 2, 1892 to May 2, 1897.

== Biography ==
Wanser was born on January 24, 1849, near New Brunswick, New Jersey.

In 1882, Wanser was elected to the New Jersey State Assembly and again in 1883. In 1885, he was appointed a police judge in Jersey City.

In 1892, Wanser was elected mayor of Jersey City when he defeated Democrat Allan L. McDermott. He was part of a Republican sweep of elections in New Jersey that went along with John W. Griggs' election as governor. He was the fourth ever Republican elected mayor of Jersey City. He was the first mayor to work in the "new" city hall which was completed in January 1896. Wanser served one five-year term (In 1885, the state legislature changed the term of mayor from two years to five years). Elected as a reform mayor, he had many in the Jersey City Democratic Party worried. During his tenure, a major controversy arose over the condition of Jersey City's water supply.

The mayoral election of 1897 was very controversial. The Republican-controlled state legislature passed the McArthur Act which postponed Jersey City and Newark's elections from spring to November to make them coincide with the state elections. The New Jersey Supreme Court ruled that this was unconstitutional. The Republicans appealed the Supreme Court's decision to the New Jersey Court of Errors and Appeals. Since the decision was under appeal, the Republicans claimed that the elections planned for April 14 should not be held at that time until the court ruled on their appeal and if they were held then their results would not be valid until after the appeal was ruled on. The Democrats claimed they would be held and their results would be valid. Democrat Edward Hoos won the election against Republican J. Herbert Potts, 15,264 votes to 12,018; however, Wanser refused to vacate the mayor's office claiming the election was not valid until their appeal was heard in court. Hoos had to formally demand Wanser to leave the office on May 3, 1897. The New Jersey Court of Errors and Appeals ruled in September in favor of Hoos.

President William McKinley nominated Wanser to be Postmaster of Jersey City in 1898. Wanser served in this position for four years.

Wanser was a 30-year member of the New Jersey National Guard rising to the rank of colonel of the Fourth Regiment and later to major general.

Wanser died of pneumonia in his home in Jersey City on January 3, 1918. He was buried in Milton, New York.

Political offices
Preceded by Orestes Cleveland	Mayor of Jersey City; 1892–1897	Succeeded by Edward Hoos
