= Bayview – New York Bay Cemetery =

Coordinates: 40.6954°N 74.0874°W

Bayview - New York Bay Cemetery
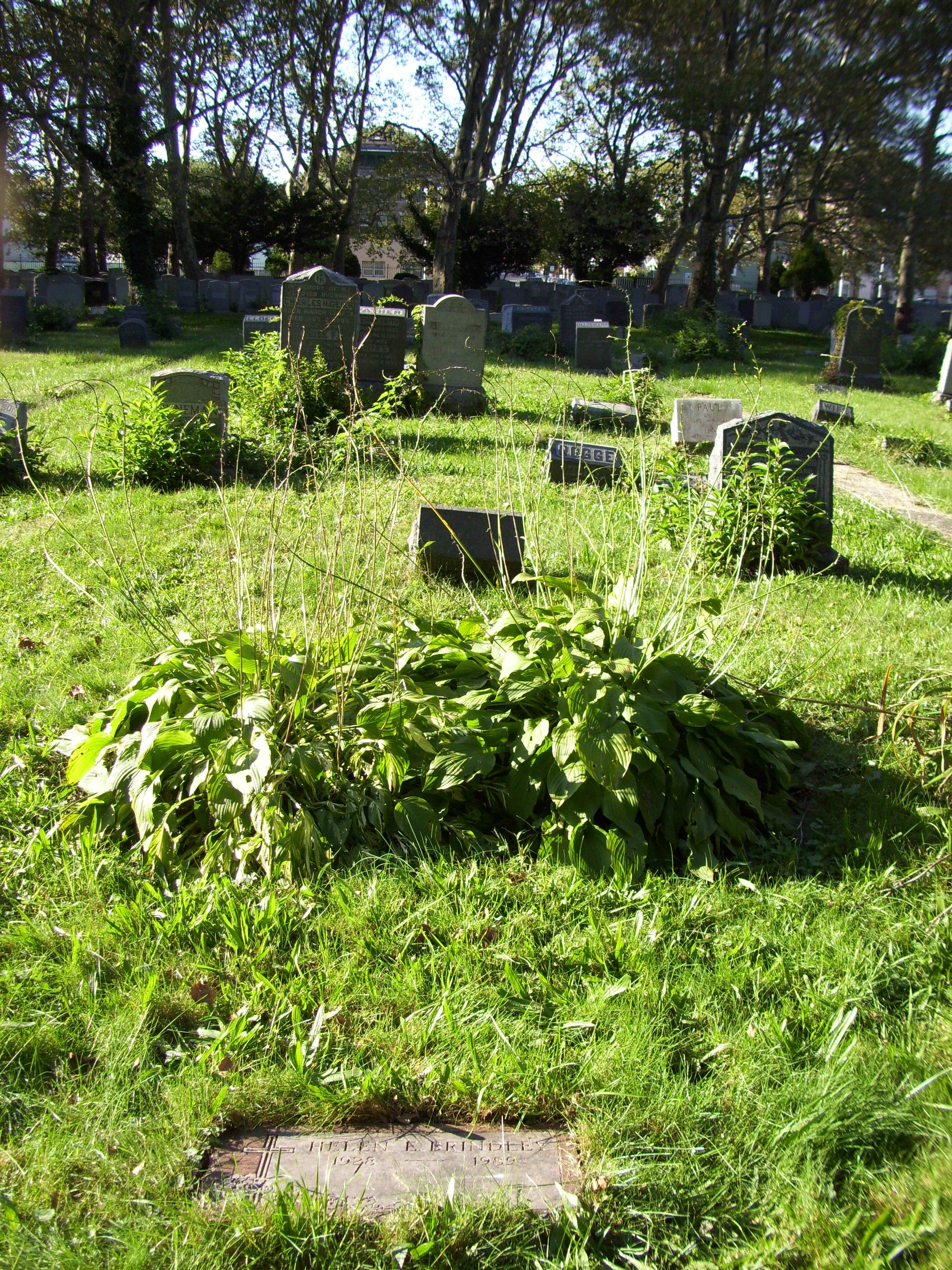
- Interactive map of Bayview - New York Bay Cemetery

Details
- Established: 1848
- Location: Jersey City, New Jersey
- Country: United States
- Type: Protestant

Bayview Cemetery, previously called Greenville Cemetery, is located in Jersey City, New Jersey. It merged with New York Bay Cemetery and is now known as Bayview – New York Bay Cemetery.

== History ==
The cemetery was built in 1848. It is located in the Greenville Section near Danforth Avenue Station. A former turnpike, the Bergen Point Plank Road, now Garfield Avenue, runs through the cemetery.

The cemetery contains a memorial and plots of several employees of the Cunard Shipping Line. Ziegler served as president of the Cemetery, from 1935 to 1957.

The cemetery contains a section which is an early Jewish burial ground, unique to Hudson County.

== Notable burials ==
- Bob Shannon (radio personality)(1948–2023), DJ and radio personality for WCBS-FM classic oldies and hits station
- Paul Broeser.
- Mary Antoinette Brown-Sherman (1926–2004), Liberian university president
- Glenn Dale Cunningham (1943–2004), Mayor of Jersey City
- William Davis Daly (1851–1900), represented New Jersey's 7th congressional district from 1899 to 1900.
- Edward Irving Edwards (1863–1931) Governor of New Jersey.
- George Bragg Fielder (1842–1906), American Civil War veteran and politician
- Edward Hoos (1850–1912), Mayor of Jersey City.
- James W. McCarthy (d. 1872), first Jersey City Fire Department firefighter to die in the line of duty
- Arthur Harry Moore (1879–1952), 39th Governor of New Jersey who served three separate terms as governor between 1926 and 1941.
- Lillian Nordica (1857–1914), American opera singer
- George Lawrence Record (1859–1933), lawyer
- Joe Simmons (1845–1901), buried under his birth name of Joseph S. Chabriel, was a Major league baseball player and manager.
- Robert G. Smith (1854–1923), American colonel and politician
- Edward Faitoute Condict Young (1835–1908), banker, manufacturer and politician.
- One Commonwealth war grave, of a World War I seaman of the Royal Naval Volunteer Reserve.
- Bob Shannon (1948-2023)
- Joseph Zito (elevator operator) (September 1, 1883 – October 22, 1932), Elevator Operator and hero of the Triangle Shirtwaist Factory fire

== See also ==
- 2019 Jersey City shooting
- Hudson County Cemeteries
