= William Clarke (mayor) =

American politician

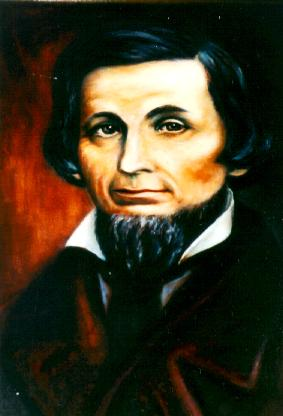

17th Mayor of Jersey City
- In office April 11, 1869 – May 1, 1870
- Preceded by: Charles H. O'Neill
- Succeeded by: Charles H. O'Neill

William Clarke was an American politician. He was the seventeenth Mayor of Jersey City, New Jersey. He succeeded Charles H. O'Neill. Clarke served from April, 1869 to May 1, 1870. He was succeeded by Charles H. O'Neill.
