= Robert Gilchrist (mayor) =

American politician

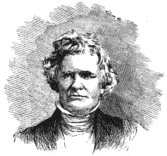

8th Mayor of Jersey City
- In office April 19, 1850 – May 2, 1852
- Preceded by: Henry C. Taylor
- Succeeded by: David S. Manners

Personal details
- Born: c. 1790
- Died: July 11, 1866 Jersey City, New Jersey
- Spouse: Frances Vashér
- Children: Robert Jr. & Mary

Robert Gilchrist was the eighth mayor of Jersey City in New Jersey.

Born around 1790, Gilchrist became the president of the Jersey Board of Selectmen from 1835 to 1836. He succeeded Henry C. Taylor as mayor. He served two years from April 19, 1850 to May 2, 1852. He was succeeded by David S. Manners. He was the Clerk of Hudson County from 1840 to 1865.

Gilchrist's son Robert Jr. became the Attorney General of New Jersey and served from 1870 to 1875.
