= Orestes Cleveland =

American politician

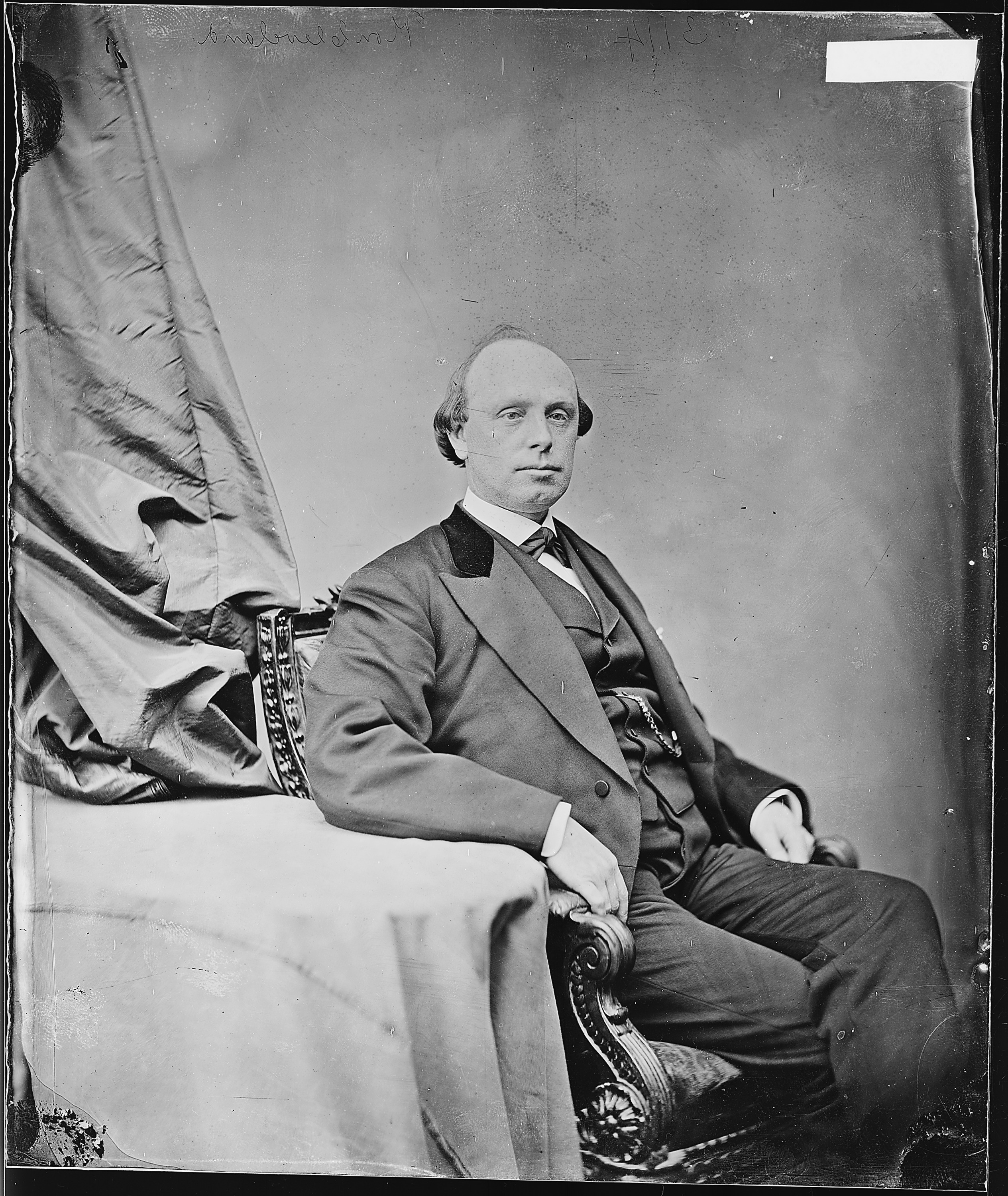

Member of the U.S. House of Representatives from New Jersey's 5th district
- In office March 4, 1869 – March 3, 1871
- Preceded by: George A. Halsey
- Succeeded by: George A. Halsey

14th and 24th Mayor of Jersey City
- In office May 2, 1864 – May 5, 1867
- Preceded by: John B. Romar
- Succeeded by: James Gopsill
- In office May 3, 1886 – May 1, 1892
- Preceded by: Gilbert Collins
- Succeeded by: Peter F. Wanser

Personal details
- Born: March 2, 1829 Duanesburg, New York, US
- Died: March 30, 1896 (aged 67) Norwich, Vermont, US
- Party: Democratic
- Profession: Politician, Leather manufacturer

Orestes Cleveland (March 2, 1829 – March 30, 1896) was an American manufacturer and Democratic Party politician who represented New Jersey's 5th congressional district for two terms from 1869 to 1871, and served two separate stints as Mayor of Jersey City.

== Early life and career ==
Cleveland was born in Duanesburg, New York, on March 2, 1829, a son of Elijah Cleveland and Mary Ann (Bartlett) Cleveland. He attended common schools, then moved to New York City to begin a business career. Beginning as a clerk with William Miller, an importer of silverware and fancy goods, Cleveland eventually worked his way up to a partnership.

In 1850, he moved to Jersey City, New Jersey, where he specialized in the manufacture of black lead, stove polish and pencils. With Joseph Dixon, he helped organize the Dixon Crucible Company, of which Cleveland served as president. Dixon Crucible became one of the world's largest graphite products manufacturers in the 1870s.

In 1853, Cleveland married Dixon's daughter Jane Hitchins Dixon. They were the parents of four sons and two daughters—Joseph, Orestes, Louise, Josephine, Francis, and Converse.

== Political career ==
Cleveland was a member of the Jersey City Board of Aldermen in 1861 and 1862, serving as president in the latter year, and was mayor of Jersey City from 1864 to 1867.

=== Congress ===
Cleveland was elected a Democrat to the United States House of Representatives in 1868, serving from 1869 to 1871, being unsuccessful for reelection in 1870.

== Later career ==
Afterward, he engaged in business with the Forbes Fibre Company in Jersey City, New Jersey, was an unsuccessful Democratic candidate for Governor of New Jersey in 1880 losing to George C. Ludlow, and was again mayor of Jersey City, serving again from 1886 to 1892. Cleveland was one of the organizers of the Jersey City Board of Trade in 1888 and served as its first president. He moved to Tenafly, New Jersey in 1892 and then again to Englewood, New Jersey.

== Death ==
He died in Norwich, Vermont on March 30, 1896, where he had gone in search of health. He was interred in Fairview Cemetery in Norwich.

Political offices
Preceded by John B. Romar	Mayor of Jersey City, New Jersey; May 2, 1864 – May 5, 1867	Succeeded by James Gopsill
Preceded by Gilbert Collins	Mayor of Jersey City, New Jersey; May 3, 1886 – May 1, 1892	Succeeded by Peters F. Wanser
U.S. House of Representatives
Preceded by George A. Halsey	Member of the U.S. House of Representatives from New Jersey's 5th congressional district March 4, 1869 – March 3, 1871	Succeeded by George A. Halsey
