= Henry C. Taylor =

American politician

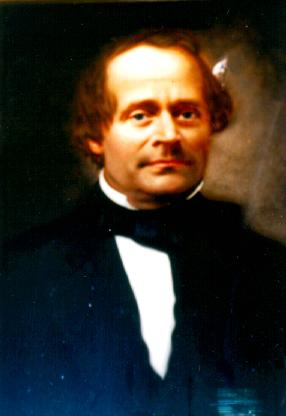

7th Mayor of Jersey City
- In office April 21, 1848 – April 18, 1850
- Preceded by: Phineas C. Dummer
- Succeeded by: Robert Gilchrist

Personal details
- Born: 1814
- Died: 1889 (aged 74–75) Plainfield, New Jersey

Henry C. Taylor (c. 1814 – March 30, 1889) was the seventh mayor of Jersey City in New Jersey.

== Biography ==
He succeeded Phineas C. Dummer and served two years from April 21, 1848, to April 18, 1850. He was succeeded by Robert Gilchrist. After serving as mayor, Taylor moved to Plainfield, New Jersey, where he died in 1889. Taylor was buried in Woodlawn Cemetery.

== See also ==
- List of mayors of Jersey City, New Jersey
