= Henry J. Hopper =

American politician (1830–1905)

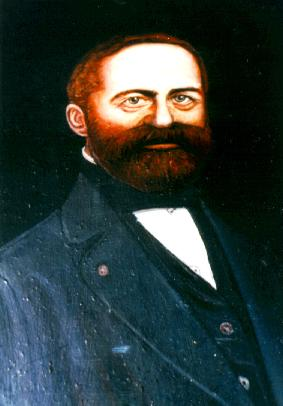

21st Mayor of Jersey City
- In office May 6, 1878 – May 2, 1880
- Preceded by: Charles Seidler
- Succeeded by: Isaac William Taussig

Personal details
- Born: 1830 New Jersey
- Died: October 6, 1905 (aged 74–75) East Orange, New Jersey
- Party: Democratic
- Spouse: Margaret Stagg Mount
- Children: Sophronia, Arthur and Marian

Henry J. Hopper (1830–1905) was the 21st Mayor of Jersey City, New Jersey from May 6, 1878, to May 2, 1880.

== Biography ==
Hopper was born in 1830 in New Jersey. He married Margaret Stagg Mount on April 3, 1855. They had three children; Sophronia, Arthur and Marian. He became a steel merchant with the Crucible Steel Company of New York City. A Democrat, he was elected mayor on April 9, 1878. After serving one term as mayor, the Democrats did not re-nominate him but instead went with Isaac William Taussig.

Hopper died in his home in East Orange, New Jersey on October 6, 1905.
