= David S. Manners =

American politician

David Stout Manners
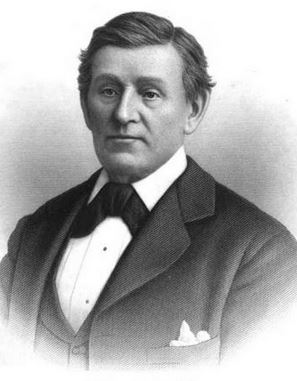

9th Mayor of Jersey City
- In office May 3, 1852 – May 3, 1857
- Preceded by: Robert Gilchrist
- Succeeded by: Samuel Wescott

Personal details
- Born: January 12, 1808 East Amwell Township, New Jersey
- Died: August 19, 1884 (aged 76)
- Party: Whig
- Spouse: Deborah Phillips Johnes

David Stout Manners (January 12, 1808 – August 19, 1884) was the ninth Mayor of Jersey City. He succeeded Robert Gilchrist. A Whig politician, he served five one-year terms from May 3, 1852, to May 3, 1857. He was succeeded by Samuel Wescott.

== Biography ==
He was born on January 12, 1808, at East Amwell Township, New Jersey. He was the son of David Manners, an army captain during the War of 1812. His grandfather was John Schenck, a captain during the American Revolution who served at the Battle of Princeton and the Battle of Monmouth.

He married Deborah Phillips Johnes in 1843 and had four daughters and three sons: Virginia (wife of John W. Beekman), Marie Louise, Helen, Blanche, Sheridan, Edwin, and Clarence. He is the first cousin of New Jersey state senator John Manners.

He died on August 19, 1884.
