= Charles Siedler =

20th Mayor of Jersey City, New Jersey, US

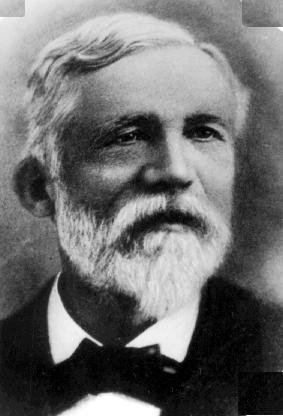

20th Mayor of Jersey City
- In office May 1, 1876 – May 5, 1878
- Preceded by: Henry Traphagen
- Succeeded by: Henry J. Hopper

Personal details
- Born: May 24, 1839 Münden, Kingdom of Hanover
- Died: June 28, 1921 (aged 82) Bloomfield, New Jersey
- Party: Republican
- Spouse(s): Julia T. Franklin & Grace Syms
- Children: Ella M., Pierre Lorillard, Julia, Charlotte M. and George J.

Charles Siedler (May 24, 1839, in Münden, Kingdom of Hanover – June 28, 1921, in Bloomfield, New Jersey) was the 20th Mayor of Jersey City, New Jersey, from May 1, 1876, to May 5, 1878.

== Biography ==
Charles was the son of Joseph Siedler and Charlotte Hildebrand. His mother died shortly after he was born. He and his father then immigrated to New York City in 1842. His father died in 1851, forcing Siedler to find work. He eventually joined the P. Lorillard Tobacco Company in the Bronx. He married Julia T. Franklin and had five children; Ella M., Pierre Lorillard, Julia, Charlotte M. and George J. By 1868, Siedler became a partner of Pierre Lorillard. Shortly after in 1872, the company moved to downtown Jersey City. Later, Siedler became the president of the Bergen Savings Bank in Jersey City.

The Republicans, who needed a candidate, talked Siedler into running for mayor of Jersey City. Siedler was elected as Jersey City's second Republican mayor and served one two-year term. He was dissatisfied with politics and left after his term was served in 1878. Less than two months later, on June 28, 1878, his wife Julia died. On October 28, 1879, Siedler married Grace Syms of Hoboken.

He retired from P. Lorillard Co. in 1894. He later moved to Bloomfield, New Jersey where he died on June 28, 1921. Siedler is buried in Bayview – New York Bay Cemetery in Jersey City.

Political offices
Preceded by Henry Traphagen	Mayor of Jersey City; 1876–1878	Succeeded by Henry J. Hopper
