= Henry Traphagen =

American politician

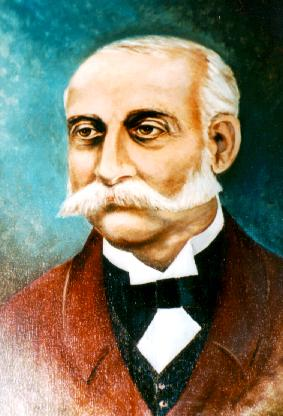

19th Mayor of Jersey City
- In office May 4, 1874 – April 30, 1876
- Preceded by: Charles H. O'Neill
- Succeeded by: Charles Seidler

Personal details
- Born: June 1, 1842 Jersey City, New Jersey
- Died: October 11, 1918 (aged 76) Tenafly, New Jersey
- Party: Democratic
- Spouse: Annie Matilda Cambell (m. 1869–1918)
- Children: Sarah Conselyea Drayton, Henry Mackaness Traphagen, Anne Campbell Wortendyke, William Conselyea Traphagen, Frederick Putnam Traphagen
- Parent: Henry Mackaness Traphagen
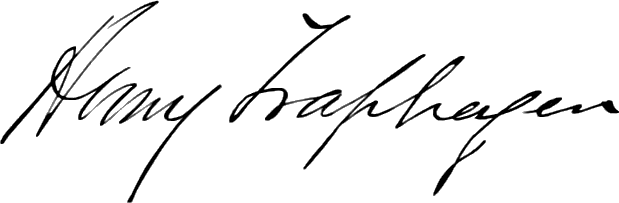
- Signature

Henry Traphagen (June 1, 1842 – October 11, 1918) was a lawyer and the mayor of Jersey City, New Jersey, for the Democratic Party from May 4, 1874, to April 30, 1876.

== Early life ==
He was born on June 1, 1842, in Jersey City to Henry Mackaness Traphagen and Sarah Conselyea. He had a brother, New York State Senator William C. Traphagen, who was the father of bank president John C. Traphagen. He was the great-grandson of former Jersey City mayor Cornelius Van Vorst. He was a descendant of Willem Traphagen, from Lemgo, County of Lippe, who settled in Manhattan in 1652. He studied at Rutgers College and Brown University and became an attorney in 1864.

== Career ==
He was elected mayor and served one term, from May 4, 1874, to April 30, 1876.

== Personal life ==
He married Annie Matilda Cambell (1847-1919) on November 9, 1869.

He died on October 11, 1918, in Tenafly, New Jersey.

Political offices
Preceded by Charles H. O'Neill	Mayor of Jersey City; 1874–1876	Succeeded by Charles Seidler
