= Charles H. O'Neill =

American politician (1800–1897)

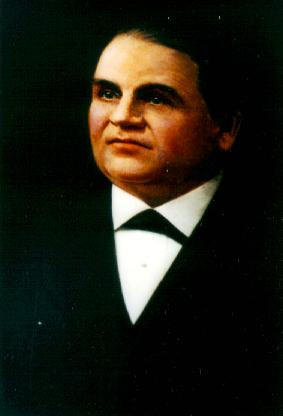
- Charles Henry O'Neill (1829-1897) in 1868

16th and 18th Mayor of Jersey City
- In office May 4, 1868 – April 10, 1869
- Preceded by: James Gopsill
- Succeeded by: William Clarke
- In office May 2, 1870 – May 3, 1874
- Preceded by: William Clarke
- Succeeded by: Henry Traphagen

Personal details
- Born: May , 1800 Paterson, New Jersey
- Died: November 8, 1897 (aged 97) Jersey City, New Jersey
- Party: Democrat
- Children: Patrick, Thomas E., Susan, Catherine, Theresa, Ellen & Esther

Charles H. O'Neill (May 1800 – November 8, 1897) was an Irish-American politician and a Democrat who served as Mayor of Jersey City, New Jersey, from May 4, 1868 until April 10, 1869, when he resigned, and again from May 2, 1870 until May 3, 1874.

O'Neill was born in Paterson, New Jersey, working as a shoemaker, in the timber, coal and building material trades and serving as alderman before moving to Jersey City to set up business there. He was first elected as mayor in 1868, but resigned less than a year later. William Clarke was appointed to fill his unexpired term. O'Neill was elected again in 1870 and re-elected in 1872. After his second term, he was succeeded by Democrat Henry Traphagen.

O'Neill died of cirrhosis of the liver in his home in Jersey City on November 8, 1897.

Political offices
Preceded by James Gopsill	Mayor of Jersey City; 1868–1869	Succeeded by William Clarke
Preceded by William Clarke	Mayor of Jersey City; 1870 –1874	Succeeded by Henry Traphagen
