= Isaac W. Taussig =

Mayor of Jersey City, New Jersey from 1880 to 1884

Isaac William Taussig
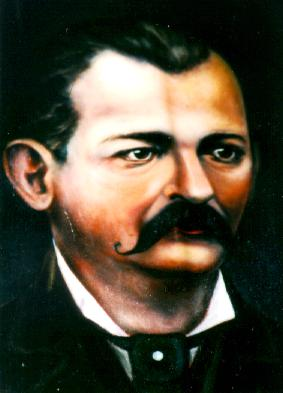

22nd Mayor of Jersey City
- In office May 3, 1880 – May 4, 1884
- Preceded by: Henry J. Hopper
- Succeeded by: Gilbert Collins

Personal details
- Born: July 30, 1850 New York City
- Died: February 9, 1917 (aged 66) New York City
- Party: Democratic
- Spouse: Cecilia Frank
- Relations: Samuel Taussig, brother
- Children: Jerome Lafayette Taussig; Allan Lincola Taussig; Frank Taussig (1892–1982)

Isaac William Taussig (July 30, 1850 – February 9, 1917) was the 22nd Mayor of Jersey City, New Jersey, serving from May 3, 1880, to May 4, 1884.

== Biography ==
The son of German Jewish immigrants, Isaac Taussig was born on July 30, 1850, in Manhattan, New York City. He had two brothers, Samuel Taussig and Noah W. Taussig. Isaac became a sugar refiner with the American Molasses Company and a candy merchant. A Democrat, he was nominated for mayor of Jersey City in a very controversial selection when the Jersey City Democrats voted not to re-nominate incumbent Henry J. Hopper. Taussig won by a closer than expected majority and eventually served two terms as mayor.

In August 1883, during his second term, Taussig's rock candy company, Taussig & Hammerschlag, went out of business. In September, Taussig and his partner Moritz Hammerschlag were arrested and charged with fraud. The Havemeyer Sugar Refining Company brought a lawsuit against them claiming they were induced to making a loan based on false financial statements made to Bradstreet's Mercantile Agency by Taussig in April 1883. Taussig and Hammerschlag lost the suit in December 1884.

Taussig married Cecilia Frank in San Francisco on December 14, 1887. He died in New York City on February 9, 1917. His widow died on May 8, 1933.

Political offices
Preceded by Henry J. Hopper	Mayor of Jersey City; 1880–1884	Succeeded by Gilbert Collins
