= Phineas C. Dummer =

American politician (1797–1875)

Phineas Cook Dummer
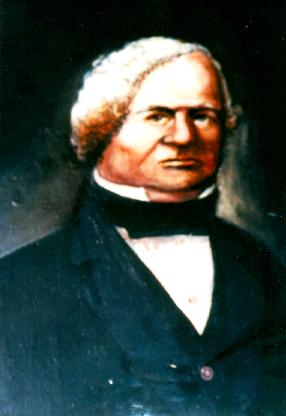

6th Mayor of Jersey City
- In office April, 1844 – April 20, 1848
- Preceded by: Peter Bentley, Sr.
- Succeeded by: Henry C. Taylor

Personal details
- Born: October 28, 1797 New Haven, Connecticut
- Died: September 14, 1875 (aged 77) Jersey City, New Jersey
- Party: Whig
- Spouse: Eliza Dobbs Holt

Phineas Cook Dummer (October 28, 1797 – September 14, 1875) was the sixth mayor of Jersey City in New Jersey. He succeeded Peter Bentley, Sr. A Whig politician, he served four one-year terms from April 1844 to April 20, 1848. He was succeeded by Henry C. Taylor.

== Biography ==
Born in New Haven, Connecticut, in 1787, he served in the New York Militia during the War of 1812. Dummer married Eliza Dobbs Holt, daughter of New London, Connecticut, newspaper editor Charles Holt, on September 21, 1821, and they moved to Jersey City in 1824.

Dummer joined his brother George Dummer's Jersey Glass Company on Washington Street between Essex Street and the Morris Canal in Paulus Hook (later became incorporated as Jersey City). He later obtained a patent for the manufacture of pressed glass by a process called "Dummer's scallop or coverplate." By the 1840s, the glass company was known as P.C. Dummer & Company and was selling glassware for home, decorative and commercial use. The company went out of business after the economic downturn following the Civil War.

After serving as mayor, Dummer served as Chief of the Fire Department in 1850.

After his company went out of business, Dummer was elected City Collector of Taxes, and afterwards appointed Deputy collector of customs of the Port of New York, by Abraham Lincoln and re-appointed under Ulysses S. Grant. He held the position until his death on September 14, 1875, in Jersey City, New Jersey.

== See also ==
- List of mayors of Jersey City, New Jersey
