= Mayor of Jersey City, New Jersey =

Political office in Jersey City, NJ, USA

Mayor of the City of Jersey City
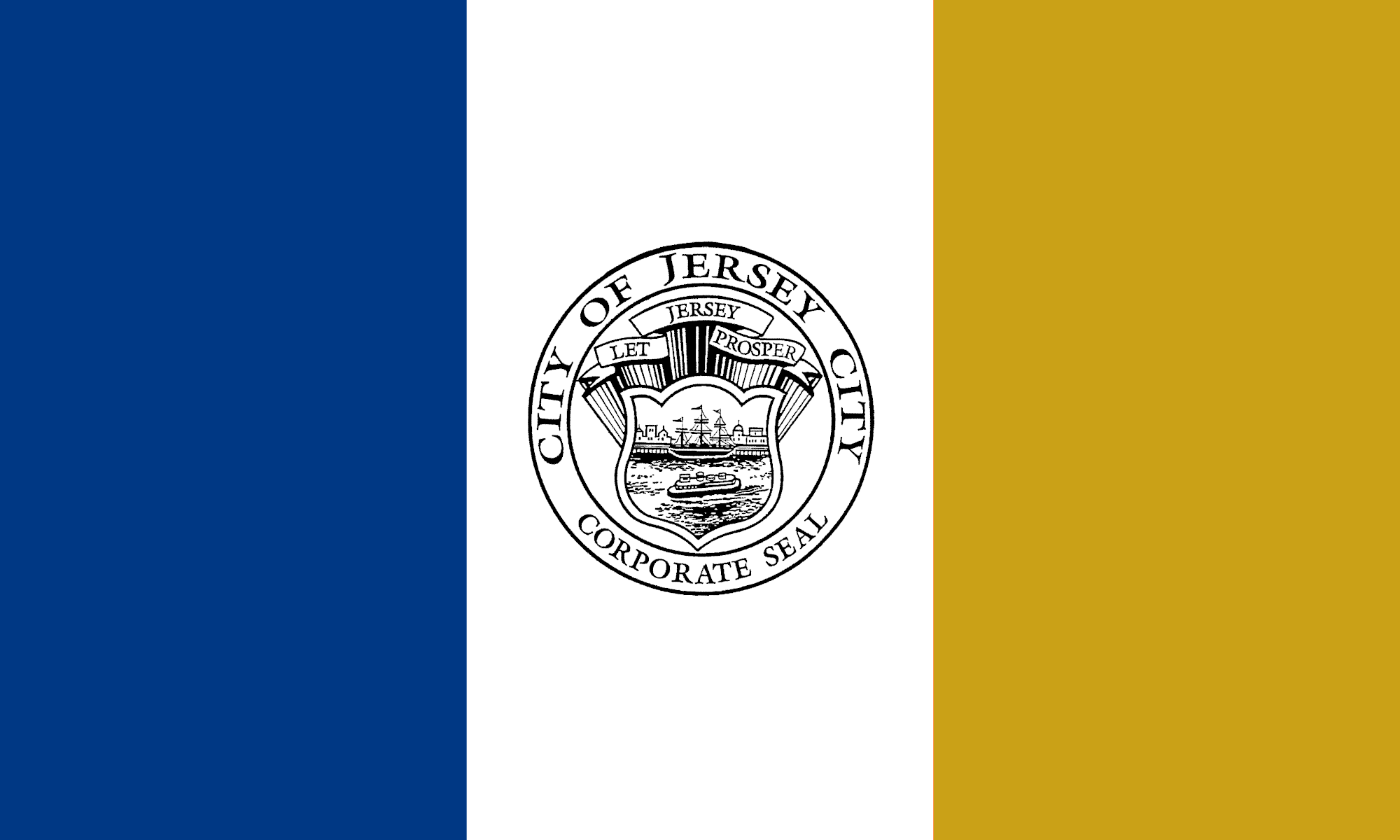
- Flag of Jersey City

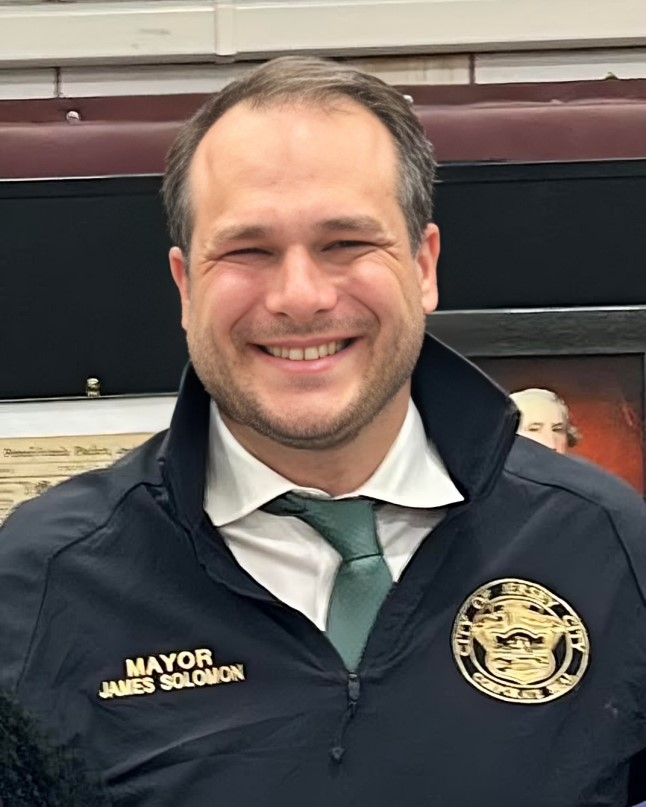
- Incumbent; James Solomon since January 15, 2026
- Type: Mayor–council
- Status: Active
- Seat: Jersey City City Hall
- Term length: Four years
- Formation: February 22, 1838
- First holder: Dudley S. Gregory
- Deputy: Vivian Brady-Phillips; Marcos Vigil
- Website: www.jerseycitynj.gov

The mayor of the City of Jersey City is the head of the executive branch of the government of Jersey City, New Jersey. The mayor has the duty to enforce the municipal charter and local ordinances, prepare the annual budget, appoint deputy mayors and department heads, and approve or veto ordinances passed by the Municipal Council. The mayor is popularly elected in a nonpartisan general election. The office is held for a four-year term without term limits.

Since the city was chartered on February 22, 1838, forty-four individuals have held the office of mayor. Dudley S. Gregory was the city's inaugural mayor and served on three occasions for a total of five years. The current mayor is James Solomon who assumed office on January 15, 2026, after defeating former state governor Jim McGreevey, in the December 2025 runoff election.

== Duties and powers ==
The City of Jersey City is organized as a mayor–council government under the Faulkner Act. This provides for a citywide elected mayor serving in an executive role and a Municipal Council serving in a legislative role. All of these offices are selected in a nonpartisan municipal election, and all terms are four years.

Under state law, the mayor has the duty to enforce the charter and ordinances of the city and all applicable state laws; report annually to the council and the public on the state of the city; supervise and control all departments of the government; prepare and submit to the council annual operating and capital budgets; supervise all city property, institutions, and agencies; sign all contracts and municipal bonds requiring the approval of the city; negotiate all contracts; and serve as a member, either voting or ex officio, of all appointive bodies.

The mayor has the power to appoint department heads with the Municipal Council's approval and can remove department heads, subject to a two-thirds disapproval by the council. The mayor may also approve or veto ordinances, subject to an override vote of two-thirds of the council, and appoint deputy mayors. The mayor is permitted to attend and participate in Municipal Council meetings without a vote, except in the case of a tie on the question to fill a council vacancy.

== Elections ==
Under the original 1838 charter, mayors were elected citywide for a one-year term. In 1868, the New Jersey Legislature extended the term of office to two years. In 1892, the legislature again changed the term to five years. The city adopted a commission form of government under the Walsh Act in 1913. This form provided for a five-member commission with both executive and legislative powers, elected for four years. The commissioners elected one of their members as mayor. Under this system, the mayor's only specific power was to appoint the school board; otherwise, he was first among equals. Jersey City adopted its current mayor-council form of government on May 7, 1961.

Elections for mayor are held every four years on the date of the general election, which is the first Tuesday after the first Monday in November. If no candidate receives a majority of votes, a runoff election is held on the fourth Tuesday following the general election. The term of office commences on January 15. The latest Jersey City mayoral election was held in 2025.

== Succession ==
If the mayor is absent, disabled, or otherwise prevented from performing their duties, the mayor may designate the business administrator or any other department head as acting mayor for up to 60 days. In the event of a vacancy, the President of the Municipal Council becomes acting mayor, and the council has 30 days to name an interim mayor. If no interim mayor is named, the Council President continues as acting mayor until a successor is elected or the council reorganizes and selects a new president. Prior to 1971, there was no automatic succession law. The office was left vacant for 47 days in 1963 when the city council failed to reach a decision on appointing an interim mayor.

== Mayors ==
No.	Mayor	Took office	Left office	Tenure	Party	Election
1	Dudley S. Gregory (1800–1874); 1st time	April 1838	April 1840	2 years	Whig	TBA
2	Peter McMartin (1805–?)	April 1840	April 1841	1 year	Unknown (Note: No source has been found to verify a party affiliation.)	TBA
3	Dudley S. Gregory (1800–1874); 2nd time	April 1841	April 1842	1 year	Whig	TBA
4	Thomas A. Alexander (1800–1866)	April 1842	April 1843	1 year	Unknown	TBA
5	Peter Bentley Sr. (1805–1875)	April 1843	April 1844	1 year	Democratic	TBA
6	Phineas C. Dummer (1797–1875)	April 1844	April 20, 1848	4 years	Whig	TBA
7	Henry C. Taylor (c. 1814–1889)	April 21, 1848	April 18, 1850	1 year, 362 days	Whig	TBA
8	Robert Gilchrist (c. 1790–1866)	April 19, 1850	May 2, 1852	2 years, 13 days	Whig	TBA
9	David S. Manners (1808–1884)	May 3, 1852	May 3, 1857	5 years, 0 days	Whig	TBA
10	Samuel Wescott (TBA–TBA)	May 4, 1857	May 2, 1858	363 days	Democratic	TBA
11	Dudley S. Gregory (1800–1874); 3rd time	May 3, 1858	May 6, 1860	2 years, 3 days	Republican	TBA
12	Cornelius Van Vorst (1822–1906)	May 7, 1860	May 4, 1862	1 year, 362 days	Democratic	TBA
13	John B. Romar (c. 1825–1892)	May 5, 1861	May 1, 1864	2 years, 362 days	Democratic	TBA
14	Orestes Cleveland (1829–1896); 1st time	May 2, 1864	May 5, 1867	3 years, 3 days	Democratic	TBA
15	James Gopsill (1823–1884)	May 6, 1867	May 3, 1868	363 days	Republican	TBA
16	Charles H. O'Neill (1800–1897); 1st time	May 4, 1868	April 10, 1869 (Note: O'Neill resigned after one year, refusing to serve the new two-year term mandated by the legislature.)	341 days	Democratic	TBA
17	William Clarke (TBA–TBA); Interim	April 11, 1869	May 1, 1870	1 year, 20 days	Democratic	App.
18	Charles H. O'Neill (1800–1897); 2nd time	May 2, 1870	May 3, 1874	4 years, 1 day	Democratic	TBA
19	Henry Traphagen (1842–1918)	May 4, 1874	April 30, 1876	1 year, 362 days	Democratic	TBA
20	Charles Siedler (1839–1921)	May 1, 1876	May 5, 1878	2 years, 4 days	Republican	TBA
21	Henry J. Hopper (1830–1905)	May 6, 1878	May 2, 1880	1 year, 362 days	Democratic	TBA
22	Isaac W. Taussig (1850–1917)	May 3, 1880	May 4, 1884	4 years, 1 day	Democratic	TBA
23	Gilbert Collins (1846–1920)	May 5, 1884	May 2, 1886	1 year, 362 days	Republican	TBA
24	Orestes Cleveland (1829–1896); 2nd time	May 3, 1886	May 1, 1892	5 years, 364 days	Democratic	TBA
25	Peter F. Wanser (1849–1918)	May 2, 1892	May 2, 1897	5 years, 0 days	Republican	TBA
26	Edward Hoos (1850–1912)	May 3, 1897	December 31, 1901	4 years, 242 days	Democratic	TBA
27	Mark M. Fagan (1869–1955); 1st time	January 1, 1902	December 31, 1907	5 years, 364 days	Republican	TBA
28	H. Otto Wittpenn (1871–1931)	January 1, 1908	June 16, 1913	5 years, 166 days	Democratic	TBA
29	Mark M. Fagan (1869–1955); 2nd time	June 17, 1913	May 14, 1917 (Note: Fagan stepped down as mayor and retired from politics.)	3 years, 331 days	Republican	TBA
30	Frank Hague (1876–1956)	May 15, 1917	June 17, 1947 (Note: Hague stepped down as mayor.)	30 years, 33 days	Democratic	TBA
31	Frank H. Eggers (1901–1954)	June 17, 1947	May 16, 1949	1 year, 333 days	Democratic	App.
32	John V. Kenny (1893–1975)	July 1, 1949	December 15, 1953 (Note: Kenny resigned shortly after winning re-election, citing poor health.)	4 years, 167 days	Democratic	TBA
33	Bernard J. Berry (1902–1963)	December 15, 1953	June 30, 1957	3 years, 197 days	Democratic	TBA
34	Charles S. Witkowski (1907–1993)	July 1, 1957	June 30, 1961	3 years, 364 days	Democratic	TBA
35	Thomas Gangemi (1903–1976)	July 1, 1961	September 26, 1963 (Note: Gangemi resigned from office when it was revealed that he was not a United States citizen and was ineligible to serve. Jersey City was without a mayor for 47 days while the city council failed to reach a consensus on a successor.)	2 years, 87 days	Democratic	TBA
Vacant		September 26, 1963	November 13, 1963			
36	Thomas J. Whelan (1922–2002)	November 13, 1963	July 6, 1971 (Note: Whelan was removed from office after being convicted of conspiracy and extortion.)	7 years, 235 days	Democratic	TBA
37	Charles K. Krieger (1914–1982); Interim	August 5, 1971	November 8, 1971	95 days	Democratic	App.
38	Paul T. Jordan (born c. 1941)	November 9, 1971	June 30, 1977	5 years, 233 days	Democratic	TBA
39	Thomas F. X. Smith (1928–1996)	July 1, 1977	May 12, 1981 (Note: Smith resigned to run unsuccessfully for Governor of New Jersey.)	3 years, 315 days	Democratic	TBA
40	Gerald McCann (born 1950); 1st time	July 1, 1981	June 30, 1985	3 years, 364 days	Democratic	TBA
41	Anthony R. Cucci (1922–2015)	July 1, 1985	June 30, 1989	3 years, 364 days	Democratic	TBA
42	Gerald McCann (born 1950); 2nd time	July 1, 1989	February 13, 1992 (Note: McCann was removed from office after being convicted of bank fraud.)	2 years, 227 days	Democratic	TBA
43	Marilyn Roman (born 1936); Acting	February 14, 1992	June 30, 1992	137 days	Democratic	Council; President acting as mayor
44	Joseph Rakowski (born TBA); Acting	July 1, 1992	November 10, 1992	132 days	Democratic	Council; President acting as mayor
45	Bret Schundler (born 1959)	November 11, 1992	June 30, 2001	8 years, 231 days	Republican	1992 special
45	Bret Schundler (born 1959)	November 11, 1992	June 30, 2001	8 years, 231 days	Republican	1993
45	Bret Schundler (born 1959)	November 11, 1992	June 30, 2001	8 years, 231 days	Republican	1997
46	Glenn Cunningham (1943–2004)	July 1, 2001	May 25, 2004^{[†]}	2 years, 329 days	Democratic	2001
47	L. Harvey Smith (born 1948); Acting	May 26, 2004	November 11, 2004	169 days	Democratic	Council; President acting as mayor
48	Jerramiah Healy (born 1950)	November 12, 2004	June 30, 2013	8 years, 230 days	Democratic	2004 special
48	Jerramiah Healy (born 1950)	November 12, 2004	June 30, 2013	8 years, 230 days	Democratic	2005
48	Jerramiah Healy (born 1950)	November 12, 2004	June 30, 2013	8 years, 230 days	Democratic	2009
49	Steven Fulop (born 1977)	July 1, 2013	January 14, 2026	12 years, 197 days	Democratic	2013
49	Steven Fulop (born 1977)	July 1, 2013	January 14, 2026	12 years, 197 days	Democratic	2017
49	Steven Fulop (born 1977)	July 1, 2013	January 14, 2026	12 years, 197 days	Democratic	2021
50	James Solomon (born 1984)	January 15, 2026	Incumbent	297 days	Democratic	2025

=== Notes ===
^† Died in office

== Higher offices held ==
The following is a list of higher public offices held by mayors, before or after their mayoral terms.

Mayor	Mayoral term(s)	Other offices held	References
Dudley S. Gregory	1838–1840, 1841–1842, 1858–1860	U.S. Representative (1847–1849)	
Samuel Wescott	1857–1858	New Jersey State Senator (1860–1862)	
Orestes Cleveland	1864–1867, 1886–1892	U.S. Representative (1869–1871)	
Peter Farmer Wanser	1892–1897	New Jersey General Assemblyman (1882–1883)	
Glenn Cunningham	2001–2004	New Jersey State Senator (2004)	
L. Harvey Smith	2004	New Jersey State Senator (2003–2004); New Jersey General Assemblyman (2008–2010)	

== See also ==
- Timeline of Jersey City, New Jersey
