= George Dummer =

George Dummer (c. 1782 - February 22, 1853) was the founder of the Jersey Glass Company in Paulus Hook, New Jersey. He was chairman of the board of trustees of Paulus Hook. From 1826 to 1831, he was president of the board of selectmen.

== Biography ==
He was born in about 1782 in New Haven, Connecticut. He later worked as a glass cutter in Albany, New York. He died on February 22, 1853.
