= John B. Romar =

American politician

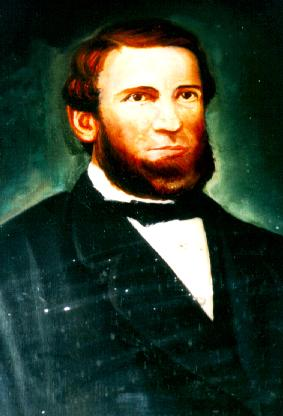

13th Mayor of Jersey City
- In office May 5, 1862 – May 1, 1864
- Preceded by: Cornelius Van Vorst
- Succeeded by: Orestes Cleveland

Personal details
- Born: c. 1825 Black Lake, Sullivan County, New York
- Died: January 16, 1892 Jersey City, New Jersey
- Spouse: Melvina

John B. Romar (c. 1825 – January 16, 1892) was the thirteenth Mayor of Jersey City. He succeeded Cornelius Van Vorst. Romar served from May 5, 1862 to May 1, 1864. He was succeeded by Orestes Cleveland.

== Biography ==
Romar was known as Jersey City's "War Mayor" due to his actions to secure a $6 per month allowance to the family of every volunteer in the American Civil War. Romar personally collected and distributed these funds to the families of volunteers in Jersey City while he was in office. In 1877, Romar ran for a seat on the Jersey City Board of Alderman, but was defeated by David W. Lawrence.
