= Provident Bank of New Jersey =

American private bank

Provident Bank
- Type: Public
- Traded as: NYSE: PFS; S&P 600 Component
- Industry: Finance, Banking
- Founded: February 27, 1839; 187 years ago
- Headquarters: Iselin, New Jersey, United States
- Key people: Christopher Martin (Executive Chairman); Anthony Labozzetta (President & CEO); Thomas Lyons (SEVP] & CFO); Bennett MacDougall (Executive Vice President, General Counsel & Corporate Secretary); Thomas Shara (Executive Vice Chairman)
- Services: Financial services
- Net income: US$115.5 million (2024)
- Total assets: US$24 billion (2024)
- Parent: Provident Financial Services, Inc
- Subsidiaries: Beacon Trust, Provident Protection Plus Company
- Website: https://www.provident.bank/

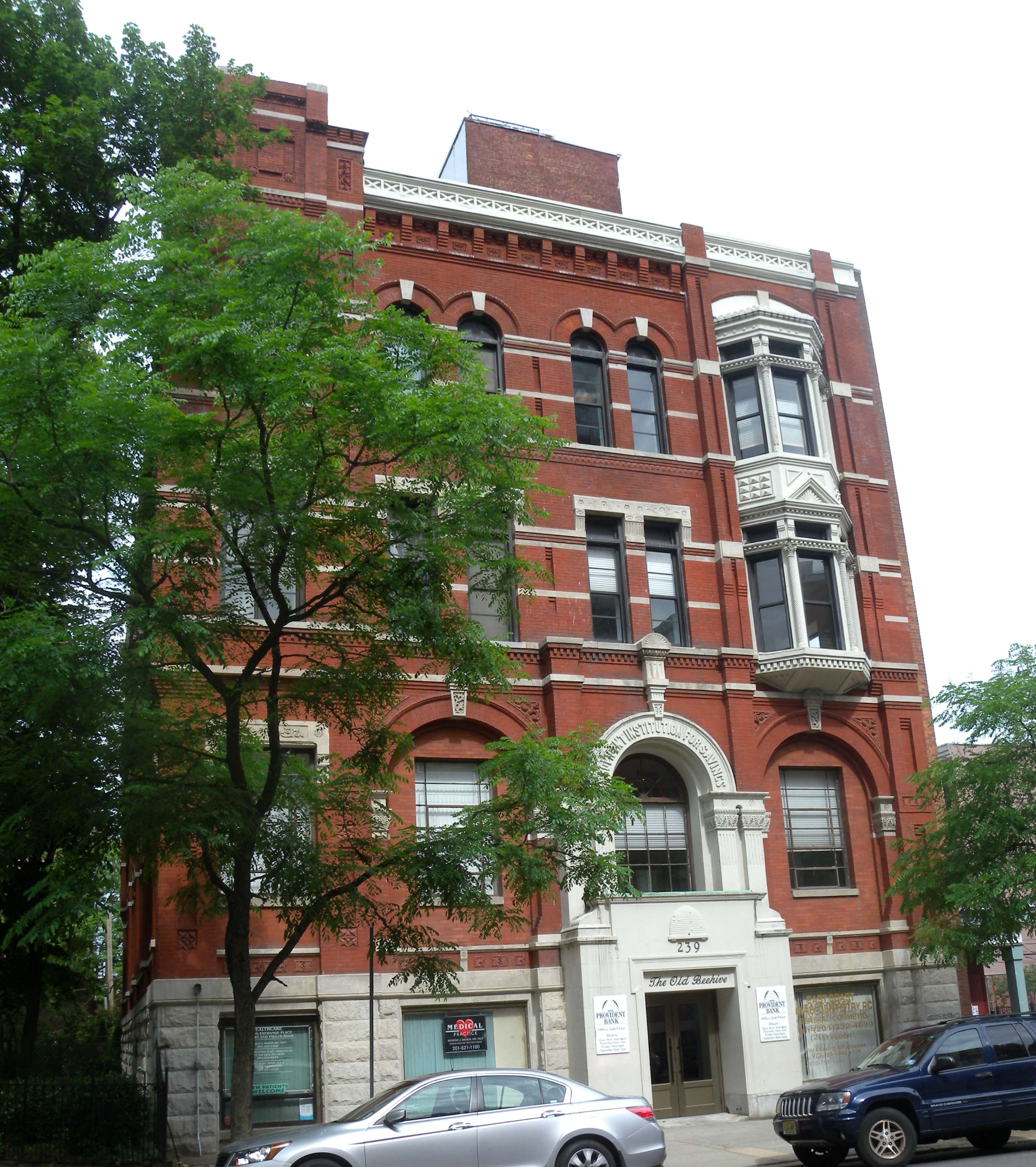
The Old Beehive Building, 239 Washington St, Jersey City

Provident Financial Services, Inc. is the holding company for Provident Bank. Established in 1839, Provident Bank provides financial services for businesses, individuals and families in New Jersey, New York, and eastern Pennsylvania. The bank offers a broad array of deposit, loan, and investment products as well as trust, fiduciary and wealth management services through its wholly owned subsidiary, Beacon Trust Company.

Provident Bank is currently the third largest bank headquartered in New Jersey by deposit market share and the oldest community bank in New Jersey.

== Corporate history ==
The Provident Institution for Savings was originally chartered by the State of New Jersey in 1839, becoming the first mutual savings bank in the history of the state. The first President was John F. Ellis from 1839 to 1841. Co-founder Dudley S. Gregory became President in 1841 and held the job until his retirement in 1874. Due to the general public mistrust of banks resulting from the Panic of 1837, it did not accept its first deposit of $227 until October 16, 1843. The Provident was run out of a room in Jersey City's Temperance Hall until moving to the office of Treasurer Peter Bentley in 1846. By 1875, Provident had assets of $3.5 million.

A run on the bank occurred on May 12, 1882 following the attempted suicide of Edmund W. Kingsland, the bank's Treasurer, in his office. The run on the bank ceased when an independent audit proved all accounts were in order. Kingsland survived the suicide attempt.

In 1989, The Provident Savings Bank celebrated its 150th anniversary.

=== Acquisition of The First National Bank of Dunellen ===
In 1978, Provident acquired the First National Bank of Dunellen. This was a pioneering move. No one had ever heard of a savings bank buying out a commercial bank. When the deal was complete, however, Provident had increased its assets by $20 million and added two new branch offices – Dunellen and Green Brook.

=== Merger with Bloomfield Savings Bank ===
Controlled growth solidified Provident’s status as a stalwart financial institution. A landmark event in the history of both Provident and its neighboring competitor Bloomfield Savings Institution was marked in 1983 when they announced a merger that would create a billion-dollar plus bank.

=== Team Capital ===
In 2014, Provident merged with Team Capital.

=== SB One Bank acquisition ===
In March 2020, Provident announced its intention to acquire SB One Bank (formerly Sussex Bank) for $208.9 million. The deal closed on July 31, 2020.

=== Lakeland Bank acquisition ===
In September 2022, Provident announced that they agreed to acquire Lakeland Bancorp, Inc.(Nasdaq: LBAI), bank holding company for Lakeland Bank, based in Oak Ridge, New Jersey, for approximately $1.3 billion. The deal closed in the first quarter of 2024. The go-live date for the conversion of Lakeland Bank into Provident was scheduled for September 3, 2024, after Labor Day weekend.

== See also ==
- Provident Institution for Sav. v. Mayor of Jersey City
