= Robert John Hoos =

Robert John Hoos (August 19, 1876 – May 16, 1929) was the tax commissioner of Jersey City, New Jersey. He was the first president of the Jersey City Chamber of Commerce.

== Biography ==
He was born on August 19, 1876, to Edward Hoos in Jersey City, New Jersey. He died on May 16, 1929.
