= Edward Hoos =

American politician

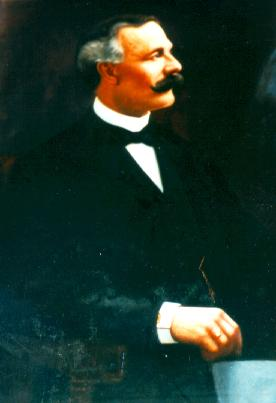

26th Mayor of Jersey City
- In office May 3, 1897 – December 31, 1901
- Preceded by: Peter Farmer Wanser
- Succeeded by: Mark M. Fagan

Personal details
- Born: August 31, 1850 Neuwied am Rhine, Germany
- Died: October 24, 1912 (aged 62) Jersey City, New Jersey, United States
- Party: Democrat
- Spouse(s): Dora Wilkins & Marie Renz
- Children: Edward H.Hoos, Dora M.Hoos, Arthur, Elizabeth (Elsa)Hoos, Anna B. Hoos, Laura Hoos, Adele L. Hoos, Robert J. Hoos, Alfred Hoos, Herbert Hoos, Georgina M. E. Hoos, Milton V. Hoos and Thelma Hoos.

Edward Hoos (August 31, 1850 – October 24, 1912) was the 26th mayor of Jersey City, New Jersey, from May 3, 1897, to December 31, 1901.

== Biography ==
Hoos was born in Neuwied, Germany, on August 31, 1850. He was an upholsterer who, after immigrating to the United States, he started a furniture business in Jersey City. His wife Dora Wilkins, of Hanover, Germany, died in 1890. In 1897, he was pushed by Democratic political boss, Robert Davis, to run for Mayor of Jersey City.

The mayoral election of 1897 was very controversial. The Republican controlled state legislature passed the McArthur Act which postponed Jersey City and Newark's elections from the Spring to November to make them coincide with the state elections. The New Jersey Supreme Court ruled that this was unconstitutional. The Republicans appealed the Supreme Court's decision to the New Jersey Court of Errors and Appeals. Since the decision was under appeal, the Republicans claimed that the elections planned for April 14 should not be held at that time until the court ruled on their appeal and if they were held then their results would not be valid until after the appeal was ruled on. The Democrats claimed they would be held and their results would be valid. Hoos won the election against Republican J. Herbert Potts, 15,264 votes to 12,018. however, Mayor Peter F. Wanser refused to vacate the mayor's office claiming the election was not valid until their appeal was heard in court. Hoos had to formally demand Wanser to leave the office on May 3, 1897. The New Jersey Court of Errors and Appeals ruled in September in favor of Hoos.

Hoos won re-election over Republican Edward M. Watson by an even bigger margin of 7,000 votes on April 11, 1899. Hoos had served two terms (May 3, 1897, to December 31, 1901), but Boss Davis knew the voters wanted a change and dumped Hoos from the ticket in 1901 in favor of Edward L. Young, son of Edward Faitoute Condict Young (Davis' financial backer). It did not matter to the voters who swept in Republican Mark M. Fagan as mayor.

Hoos died on October 24, 1912, and was buried in Bayview – New York Bay Cemetery in Jersey City alongside his wife and three of his children.

== See also ==
- List of mayors of Jersey City, New Jersey

Political offices
Preceded by Peters F. Wanser	Mayor of Jersey City; 1908–1913	Succeeded by Mark M. Fagan
