= 1993 Jersey City mayoral election =

- May 11, 1993
Candidate	Bret Schundler	Louis Manzo
Party	Nonpartisan	Nonpartisan
Popular vote	28,989	12,309
Percentage	68.4%	29.1%
Mayor before election
Bret Schundler
Nonpartisan
Elected mayor
Bret Schundler
Nonpartisan

The 1993 Jersey City mayoral election was held on May 11, 1993. Incumbent mayor Bret Schundler, who won a special election in November 1992 to complete the unexpired term of Gerald McCann, was elected to a full term in office over Louis Manzo.

== Background ==
Mayor Gerald McCann was convicted on fifteen counts of extortion, mail fraud, bank fraud, tax evasion, making false statements to the IRS, and failure to file taxes in connection with a savings and loan association scheme and removed from office on February 7, 1993 and barred from seeking re-election. A special election to complete his term was scheduled for November 1992. Because Jersey City special elections do not require a majority of the vote, Bret Schundler, a conservative Republican, won with under 18 percent of the vote.

At the time, Jersey City was notorious for political corruption, and the city government faced a $40 million budget deficit, rising crime, and a failing school system. Young middle-class residents fled the city for the suburbs, leaving the city with an aging population and shrinking property tax base from which to fund services.

== Candidates ==
- Louis Manzo, Hudson County freeholder and candidate for mayor in 1992 (Democratic)
- Bret Schundler, incumbent mayor since 1992 (Republican)
- Daniel Waddleton, Jersey City councilor (Democratic)

== Campaign ==
The Democratic Party sought to unseat Schundler by spending enormous resources into the city. Their campaign was led by Robert Janiszewski, the Hudson County Executive and the state chair of the Bill Clinton 1992 presidential campaign, and Manzo made party loyalty the keystone of his campaign message, urging voters to "vote Democratic".

== Endorsements ==
Louis Manzo

U.S. senators

- Bill Bradley, U.S. senator since 1979

Local officials

- Robert Janiszewski, Hudson County Executive

Party officials

- Raymond Lesniak, chair of the New Jersey State Democratic Committee

Individuals

- Jesse Jackson, reverend, civil rights activist, and candidate for president in 1984 and 1988

== Results ==
Candidate	Votes	Percent
Bret Schundler	28,989	68.44%
Louis Manzo	12,309	29.06%
Daniel Waddleton	1,059	2.50%
Write-in	10	0.02%
Votes	42,357	100.00%

Leaving City Hall following his victory, Schundler said that he won because his administration "[had] presented the vision that people have been asking for for a long time, and all the opposition did was try to frighten them and pit people against one another."

== Aftermath ==
Schundler's victory in an overwhelmingly Democratic city elevated him to the status of a national political celebrity by 1994.

Schundler later ran unsuccessfully for governor of New Jersey in 2001 and 2005 before briefly serving as Commissioner of Education in the cabinet of Governor Chris Christie in 2010.
