= Muslim Writers Collective =

American non-profit organization

Muslim Writers Collective (MWC) is a non-profit organization dedicated to promoting storytelling in the Muslim American community. The organization holds monthly open mics across the country featuring spoken word, poetry, comedy, music, and other art forms.

== History ==
The Collective was founded in 2014 by Hamdan Azhar and Ayisha Irfan in New York City.

MWC emerged from a heightened post-9/11 context and is composed predominantly of millennials who are either university age or young professionals and are the children of Brown and Black immigrant parents. According to a Vice magazine article published in 2016, "At a time when Islamophobia has reached new virulent and violent heights, MWC provides a space for young Muslims to honor their humanity."

MWC has held events in over a dozen cities in addition to New York, including Boston, Chicago, Dallas, Oakland, Seattle, Washington, D.C., Toronto, and Lahore, routinely drawing hundreds of attendees.

== Themes ==
Stories shared at MWC include topics such as heartbreak, family, and what it means to grow up Muslim in post-9/11 America.

== Notables ==
- Shahana Hanif, who became the first Muslim woman elected to New York City Council in 2022, started performing at MWC in 2014 and later served as an organizer and MC with the organization.
- Amani al-Khatahtbeh
- James Yee.
