= Brigid Callahan Harrison =

American political writer (born 1965)

- Born: Brigid Callahan; May 21, 1965 (age 61); Runnemede, New Jersey, U.S.
- Education: Stockton University (BA); Rutgers University, New Brunswick (MA); Temple University (PhD)
- Occupations: Academic; author; commentator
- Employer: Montclair State University
- Political party: Democratic
- Website: Official website

Brigid Callahan Harrison (born 1965) is an American academic, author, and political commentator. She is a professor of political science and law at Montclair State University, where she has taught since 1994. She is the author of American Democracy Now (McGraw-Hill Publishers, now in its fourth edition), one of the leading introductory political science textbooks in the United States. She is also the author of A More Perfect Union (McGraw-Hill Publishers, 2010), Power and Society (Cengage, now in its 14th edition) and Women in American Politics (Wadsworth, 2003), as well as various peer-refereed journal articles.

A frequent commentator in print and electronic media on U.S. politics, Harrison provides regular political analysis to ABC, NBC, CBS, Fox News, and their local affiliates, to CBS News radio, and to various NPR radio programs. She also is a regular commentator on NJTV. She is a columnist for The New York Observer, PolitickerNJ, and The Bergen Record and her editorials have appeared in The New York Times, USA Today, The Star-Ledger, and The Press of Atlantic City. Harrison has served as a moderator or panelist for numerous political debates, including the 2013 New Jersey gubernatorial debate, and the New Jersey 2012 U.S. Senate debate.

As of 2020, Harrison serves as president of the New Jersey Political Science Association.

== Early life and academic career ==
Harrison was born on May 21, 1965, and grew up the youngest of seven children in Runnemede and Margate, New Jersey. She is the daughter of John P. Callahan, who served as a councilman in Runnemede, and Rosemary Ruane Callahan. She has described her interest in politics developing as part of discussions her father would have with the family about his elected service in Runnemede.

A 1983 graduate of Holy Spirit High School in Absecon, New Jersey, she received her B.A. in liberal arts with a focus on political science and economics from Richard Stockton College (now Stockton University) in Pomona, New Jersey in 1988. She received a master's degree in 1991 in international relations and comparative politics from Rutgers University, and her Ph.D. in American politics from Temple University in 1996. Harrison's dissertation is an examination of fundraising by men and women candidates for the U.S. House of Representatives.

Harrison teaches courses in American government, Congress, the Presidency, and campaigns and elections. Her research interests include Congress and the Presidency, campaigns and elections, and American public opinion. She is an expert in the politics of the millennial generation. Harrison served as president of the National Women's Caucus for Political Science and is currently president of the New Jersey Political Science Association. She also has served as President of the Midwest Women's Caucus for Political Science and as section chair of the Northeast Political Science Association.

== Broadcast and print media ==
Harrison has worked with many major news corporations to provide political analysis on both state and national politics. She began her career in television commentary on New Jersey Network. She has appeared regularly on Fox News and Fox Business News. She has also provided analysis for ABC News, CBS News, NBC News, and their New York affiliates, as well as BBC and BBC America. Harrison has been a frequent political commentator on radio programs including NPR News, All Things Considered, CBS News Radio, Bloomberg Radio, Marty Moss-Coane, and the Brian Lehrer Show.

Harrison regularly provides political commentary to numerous print media outlets, including The New York Times, the Wall Street Journal, the Associated Press, Bloomberg, Reuters, the Star Ledger, and Gannett News Service. She also writes a weekly column for the Sunday edition of The Bergen Record. She has written editorials for The New York Times, The Star-Ledger, and USA Today.

== Congressional campaign ==
On December 16, 2019, she announced her intention to seek the Democratic nomination for the 2020 United States House of Representatives election in New Jersey's 2nd district with the intention of unseating incumbent Jeff Van Drew. On July 7, 2020, she was defeated in the Democratic primary by Amy Kennedy.

== Awards and honors ==
Harrison was inducted into the Atlantic County Women's Hall of fame in 2009. She was awarded the “Distinguished Alumna of the Year” in 2003 from the Richard Stockton College Council of Black Faculty and Staff; Atlantic County Zonta's “Women Who Make a Difference” award; Recipient of the Harold J. Goodfriend Award for Public Service; Recipient of the national MENSA Graduate fellowship.

== Publications ==
Harrison's is author or co-author of books including:

- Brigid Callahan Harrison and Jean Wahl Harris. American Democracy Now. McGraw-Hill Publishers. 1st edition 2009, 2nd edition, 2010 ISBN 0-07-337907-7
- Brigid Callahan Harrison and Jean Wahl Harris. A More Perfect Union, McGraw-Hill Publishers, 2010 ISBN 978-0-07-352638-6
- Brigid Callahan Harrison. Power and Society. Cengage, 12th edition, 2009. ISBN 978-0-495-83322-2
- Brigid Harrison. Women in American Politics. Wadsworth, 2003. ISBN 978-0-534-52822-5
