= 2020 New Jersey elections =

- November 3, 2020

Elections were held in the U.S. state of New Jersey on November 3, 2020.

Due to the COVID-19 pandemic, ballots for voting by mail were sent to all registered voters in the state. Ballots were processed immediately upon receipt. An audit of the ballots was completed in January. The results did not change the outcome and the process was generally considered a success.

== Federal offices ==
=== Executive ===
- 2020 United States presidential election in New Jersey

Joe Biden carried the state, where he won the majority in 14 of 21 counties.

=== Legislative ===
- 2020 United States Senate election in New Jersey
- 2020 United States House of Representatives elections in New Jersey

== Ballot measures ==
=== Ballot Measure 1 ===
==== Polling ====
On S.2703

Poll source	Date(s) administered	Sample size (Note: Key: A – all adults RV – registered voters LV – likely voters V – unclear)	Margin of error	For S.2703	Against S.2703	Other	Undecided
Rutgers-Eagleton	October 19–24, 2020	861 (LV)	± 4%	61%	34%	–	5%
Stockton College	October 7–13, 2020	721 (LV)	± 3.7%	66%	23%	–	10%
DKC Analytics/Brach Eichler (Note: Brach Eichler is a law firm that already supported S.2703 prior to conducting this poll)	October 5–13, 2020	500 (LV)	± 4.4%	65%	29%	–	6%
Fairleigh Dickinson University	September 30 – October 5, 2020	582 (LV)	± 4.6%	59%	30%	0% (Note: "Refused" with 0%)	11%
DKC Analytics/Brach Eichler	September 8–16, 2020	501 (LV)	± 4.4%	65%	29%	–	6%
DKC Analytics/Brach Eichler	August 5–13, 2020	500 (LV)	± 4.383%	66%	27%	–	7%
Pollfish/DKC Analytics/Brach Eichler	July 7–12, 2020	500 (LV)	± 4.383%	68%	27%	–	6%
Monmouth University	April 16–19, 2020	635 (RV)	± 3.9%	61%	34%	–	5%

On whether recreational marijuana should be legal

Poll source	Date(s) administered	Sample size	Margin of error	Yes	No	Undecided
Monmouth University	February 8–10, 2019	604 (A)	± 4%	62% (Note: Listed as "Supporting the legalisation of possession of small amounts of marijuana for personal use)	32%	5%

==== Results ====
Public Question 1 legalized marijuana by a 67.1% to 32.9% margin.

Question 1 Results by county Yes: 80–90%; 70–80%; 60–70%; 50–60%

=== Ballot Measure 2 ===
==== Polling ====
Public Question 2, Peacetime Veterans Eligible for Property Tax Deduction Amendment

Poll source	Date(s) administered	Sample size	Margin of error	Yes (for the initiative)	No (against the initiative)	Undecided
Rutgers-Eagleton	October 19–24, 2020	864 (LV)	± 4%	78%	16%	8%

==== Results ====
Public Question 2 made peacetime veterans eligible for a $250 property tax deduction, which passed by a 76.5% to 23.5% margin.

Question 2 Results by county Yes: 80–90%; 70–80%

=== Ballot Measure 3 ===
==== Polling ====
Public Question 3, Delayed State Legislative Redistricting Amendment

Poll source	Date(s) administered	Sample size	Margin of error	Yes (for the initiative)	No (against the initiative)	Undecided
Rutgers-Eagleton	October 19–24, 2020	858 (LV)	± 4%	46%	32%	22%

==== Results ====
Public Question 3 postponed the state legislative redistricting process until after the election on November 2, 2021, if the state receives federal census data after February 15, 2021, which passed by a 57.8% to 42.2% margin.

Question 3 Results by county Yes: 60–70%; 50–60%; No: 50–60%

== State legislative special elections ==
District		Incumbent			This race	
Chamber	No.	Representative	Party	First elected	Results	Candidates
Senate	25	Anthony R. Bucco	Republican	1997	Incumbent died September 16, 2019, of a heart attack. New member elected November 3, 2020. Republican hold.	▌ ✓ Anthony M. Bucco (Republican) 54.0%; ▌ Rupande Mehta (Democratic) 46.0%
Assembly	25	Anthony M. Bucco	Republican	2009	Incumbent resigned October 24, 2019, after being appointed to the New Jersey Senate. New member elected November 3, 2020. Republican hold.	▌ ✓ Aura K. Dunn (Republican) 52.5%; ▌ Darcy Draeger (Democratic) 47.5%

== See also ==
- Elections in New Jersey
- Politics of New Jersey
- Political party strength in New Jersey

== Notes ==
Partisan clients
