= Amy Kennedy =

American educator, mental health advocate, and former political candidate

Personal details
- Born: Amy Savell; November 20, 1978 (age 47) Atlantic City, New Jersey, U.S.
- Party: Democratic
- Spouses: Mark Petitgout (m. 2003; div. 2010); Patrick J. Kennedy (m. 2011)
- Children: 5
- Education: Pennsylvania State University (BS); Nova Southeastern University (MS)
- Website: Official website

Amy Kennedy (née Savell; born November 20, 1978) is an American educator, mental health advocate, and former political candidate from the state of New Jersey. She was the Democratic Party nominee in the 2020 elections to represent New Jersey's 2nd congressional district in the United States House of Representatives, losing to incumbent Jeff Van Drew.

== Early life and education ==
Amy Savell was born in Atlantic City, New Jersey, and raised in Pleasantville and Absecon. Her parents, Leni and Jerry Savell, are both teachers. Jerry also served as a freeholder for Atlantic County, New Jersey, and was a city council member in both Absecon and Pleasantville. She graduated in 1997 from Holy Spirit High School and earned a Bachelor of Science degree in elementary education from Pennsylvania State University. She later earned a Master of Science in environmental education from Nova Southeastern University.

== Career ==
Kennedy taught middle-school history at Northfield Community Schools. She later became an education director of the Kennedy Forum, a mental health advocacy group founded by her husband.

=== Politics ===
In the 2020 elections, Kennedy ran for the Democratic Party nomination for New Jersey's 2nd congressional district. On July 7, 2020, she defeated university professor Brigid Callahan Harrison and former congressional aide Will Cunningham to win the party's nomination. Kennedy's victory was particularly notable as an "upset victory" because Harrison had been supported by George Norcross, a powerful figure in New Jersey politics. As of July 9, 2020, vote totals showed Kennedy winning in all eight counties in the congressional district. She faced Republican incumbent Jeff Van Drew, who was originally elected as a Democrat, in the general election.

According to The Washington Post, Kennedy ran as an "anti-establishment insurgent trying to ride the recent energy of grass-roots activists", and was backed by Martin Luther King III, New Jersey governor Phil Murphy, and House Majority Leader Steny Hoyer. Her campaign focused on mental health issues and education. She is supportive of expanding the Affordable Care Act.

Kennedy raised $1.4 million for her primary campaign, including a $500,000 personal loan. On August 3, 2020, she received the endorsement of former president Barack Obama. Kennedy lost to Van Drew in the general election.

== Personal life ==
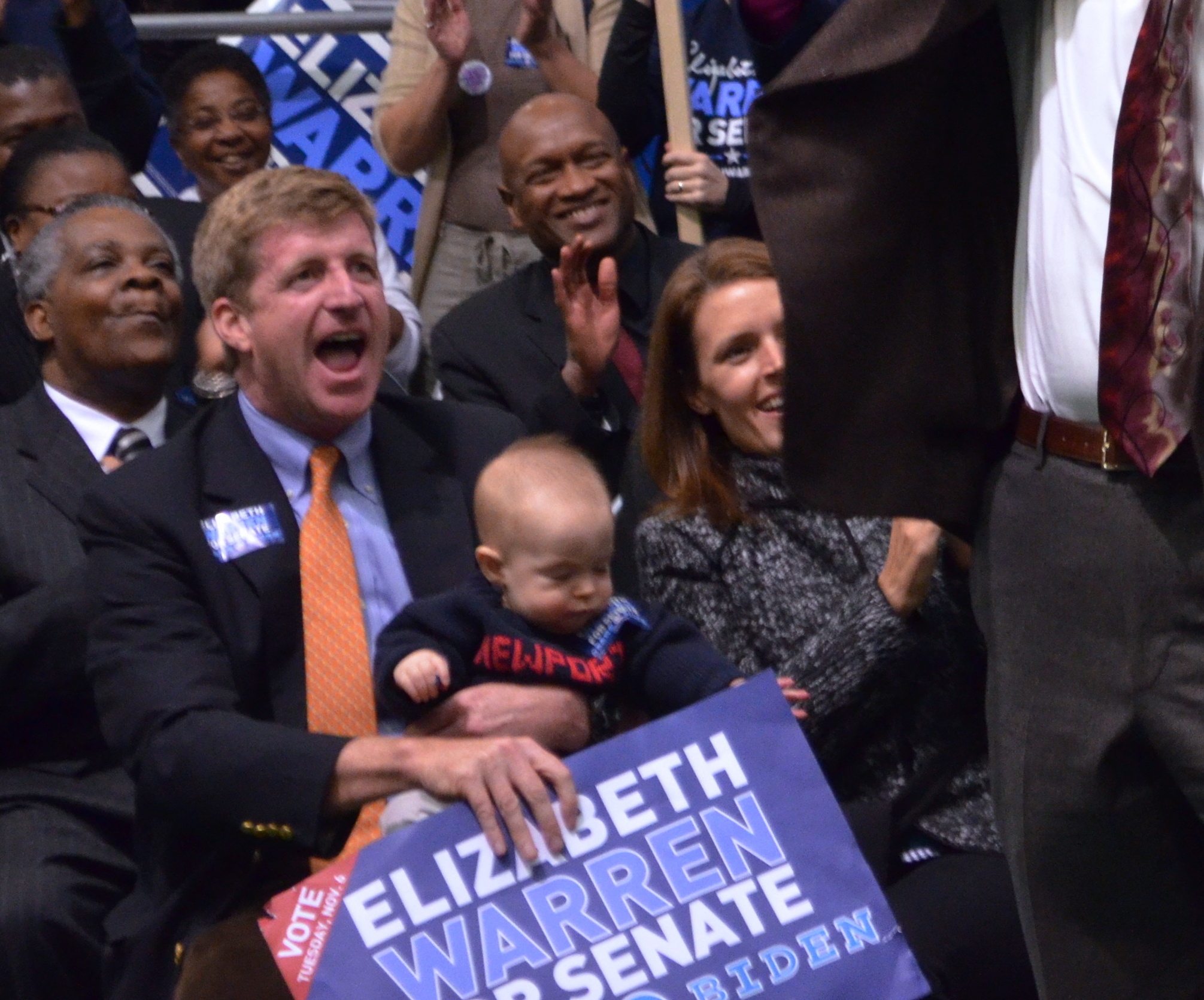
Kennedy (face partially obscured) attends a rally for the 2012 U.S. Senate campaign of Elizabeth Warren alongside her second husband and one of their children

Kennedy met Mark Petitgout in college, and they married in 2003. The brother of former NFL offensive tackle Luke Petitgout, Mark played football for the Penn State Nittany Lions. They lived in Linwood, New Jersey and had one daughter before divorcing in early 2010.

Kennedy met Patrick J. Kennedy, a member of the Kennedy family, at a mental-health forum in Atlantic City in 2010. At the time, Patrick Kennedy was the member of the U.S. House of Representatives for Rhode Island's 1st congressional district, but he retired at the midterm elections later that year. They married in July 2011 at the Kennedy family compound in Hyannis Port, Massachusetts, with Supreme Court Justice Stephen Breyer officiating. They live in Brigantine, New Jersey, with their five children.
