= 2020 United States Senate election in New Jersey =

- November 3, 2020
- Turnout: 72% (▲36pp)
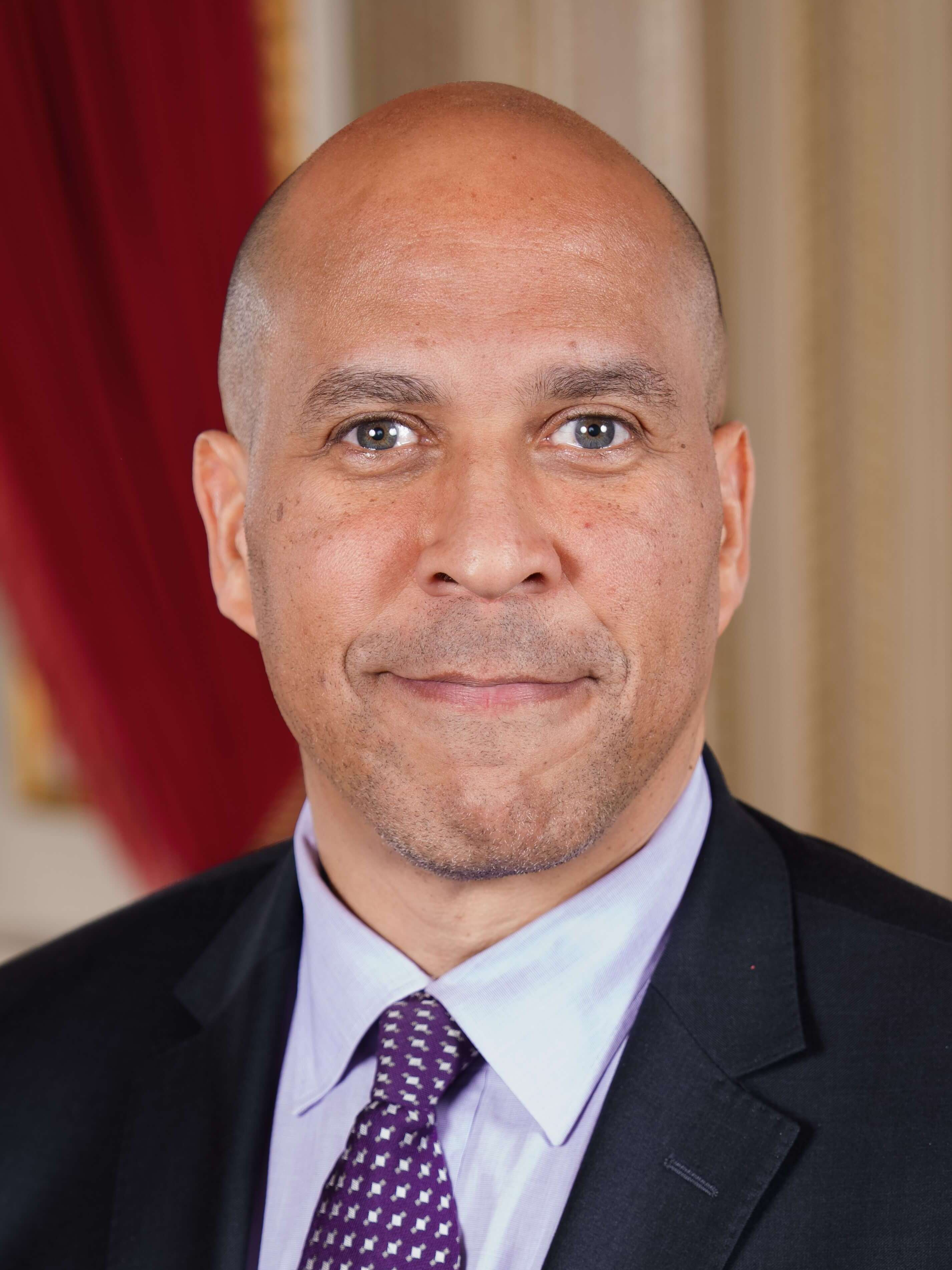

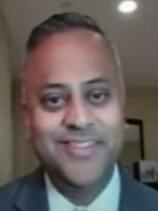
Nominee	Cory Booker	Rik Mehta
Party	Democratic	Republican
Popular vote	2,541,239	1,817,091
Percentage	57.23%	40.92%
- Booker: 40–50% 50–60% 60–70% 70–80% 80–90% >90% Mehta: 40–50% 50–60% 60–70% 70–80% 80–90% >90% Tie: 40–50% 50% No data
U.S. senator before election
Cory Booker
Democratic
Elected U.S. Senator
Cory Booker
Democratic

The 2020 United States Senate election in New Jersey was held on November 3, 2020, to elect a member of the United States Senate to represent the State of New Jersey. It was held concurrently with the 2020 United States presidential election, as well as various other elections. The primary elections were moved from June 2, 2020, to July 7, 2020, due to COVID-19 pandemic concerns. Incumbent Senator Cory Booker was first elected in a 2013 special election to complete the term of fellow Democrat Frank Lautenberg, who died in office.

Booker won a second full term against Republican Rik Mehta, narrowly winning Morris County, which no Democratic Senate candidate had carried since 1984 when Senator Bill Bradley swept every county. He also flipped Somerset County, which last voted for a Democrat for this seat in 1984. Booker also received the most votes (2,541,239) in a statewide non-presidential election in New Jersey history.

== Democratic primary ==
=== Candidates ===
==== Nominee ====
- Cory Booker, incumbent U.S. senator and former candidate for President of the United States in 2020

==== Eliminated in primary ====
- Lawrence Hamm, chairman of the People's Organization for Progress

==== Withdrew ====
- Lisa McCormick, activist and candidate for Senate in 2018 (ran for Congress in New Jersey's 12th congressional district)
- Harsh Naik

==== Declined ====
- Josh Gottheimer, incumbent U.S. representative for New Jersey's 5th congressional district (ran for re-election)
- Donald Norcross, incumbent U.S. representative for New Jersey's 1st congressional district (ran for re-election)

=== Endorsements ===
Cory Booker

State officials

- Annette Chaparro, assemblywoman, District 33
- Nicholas Chiaravalloti, assemblyman, District 31
- Sandra Bolden Cunningham, state senator, District 31
- Angelica M. Jimenez, assemblywoman, District 32
- Angela McKnight, assemblywoman, District 31
- Pedro Mejia, assemblyman, District 32
- Raj Mukherji, assemblyman, District 33
- Nicholas Sacco, state senator, District 32, Mayor of North Bergen, former assistant superintendent of North Bergen School District
- Brian P. Stack, state senator, District 33, Mayor of Union City

Local officials

- Ravi Bhalla, mayor of Hoboken
- Diane Coleman, Hudson County Register
- Jimmy Davis, mayor of Bayonne
- Tom DeGise, Hudson County Executive
- James Fife, mayor of Harrison
- Steve Fulop, mayor of Jersey City
- Mike Gonnelli, mayor of Secaucus
- Dina Grilo, mayor of East Newark
- E. Junior Maldonado, Hudson County Clerk
- Gabe Rodriguez, mayor of West New York
- Al Santos, mayor of Kearny
- Frank X. Schillari, Hudson County Sheriff
- Richard Turner, mayor of Weehawken
- Wayne Zitt, mayor of Guttenberg

Organizations

- Brady Campaign
- Coalition to Stop Gun Violence
- End Citizens United
- Giffords
- Hudson County Democratic Organization, Hudson County's chapter of the New Jersey Democratic State Committee
- Humane Society of the United States Legislative Fund
- League of Conservation Voters
- NARAL Pro-Choice America
- National Organization for Women
- Natural Resources Defense Council Action Fund
- Planned Parenthood
- Sierra Club
Lawrence Hamm

Individuals

- Cornel West, philosopher, political activist, and social critic

Organizations

- Hudson County Democratic Socialists of America
- Progressive Democrats of America

=== Results ===
Results by county: Booker—>90% Booker—80–90% Booker—70–80%

Democratic primary results
Party	Candidate	Votes	%
Democratic	Cory Booker (incumbent)	838,110	87.58%
Democratic	Lawrence Hamm	118,802	12.42%
Total votes		956,912	100.0%

== Republican primary ==
=== Candidates ===
==== Nominee ====
- Rikin "Rik" Mehta, pharmaceutical executive and attorney

==== Eliminated in primary ====
- Eugene Anagnos, retired teacher
- Tricia Flanagan, healthcare policy expert, biotech consultant, Independent candidate for U.S. Senate in 2018
- Natalie Lynn Rivera, activist, Independent candidate for U.S. Senate in 2018
- Hirsh Singh, engineer, candidate for Governor of New Jersey in 2017, and candidate for New Jersey's 2nd congressional district in 2018

==== Withdrawn ====
- Navodaya Garepalli
- Stuart Meissner, former New York Assistant Attorney General and Manhattan Assistant District Attorney, SEC Whistleblower Attorney, and Independent candidate for U.S. Senate in 2013
- Gary Rich, former Monmouth County freeholder

==== Declined ====
- Matt Rooney, attorney and political pundit

=== Endorsements ===
Rik Mehta

Former state officials

- Chris Christie, Governor of New Jersey (2010–2018)

County Republican Party organizations

- Bergen County
- Burlington County
- Essex County
- Gloucester County
- Hudson County
- Hunterdon County
- Mercer County
- Middlesex County
- Monmouth County
- Morris County
- Passaic County
- Salem County
- Somerset County
- Sussex County
- Union County
- Warren County
Hirsh Singh

County Republican Party organizations

- Atlantic County
- Cape May County
- Cumberland County
- Ocean County

=== Results ===
Results by county: Mehta: 60–70%; 50–60%; 40–50%; <40%; Singh: 70–80%; 60–70%; <40%; Flanagan: Flanagan—<40%

Republican primary results
Party	Candidate	Votes	%
Republican	Rik Mehta	154,817	38.01%
Republican	Hirsh Singh	146,133	35.88%
Republican	Tricia Flanagan	72,678	17.84%
Republican	Natalie Lynn Rivera	21,650	5.31%
Republican	Eugene Anagnos	12,047	2.96%
Total votes		407,325	100.0%

== Other candidates ==
=== Green Party ===
==== Nominee ====
- Madelyn R. Hoffman, peace activist, 2018 U.S. Senate candidate, 1997 Green Party gubernatorial candidate, and 1996 Green Party Candidate for Vice President

=== Endorsements ===
Madelyn R. Hoffman

Elected officials

- Corey Teague, member of the Paterson Board of Education

Individuals

- Ajamu Baraka, peace activist, 2016 Green Party vice presidential nominee
- Anthony Díaz, co-founder of the Newark Water Coalition; Democratic primary candidate for Essex County Freeholder
- Margaret Flowers, peace activist, former co-chair of the Green Party
- Howie Hawkins, activist, 2020 Green Party presidential nominee
- Aissa Heath, Democratic primary candidate for Union County Freeholder
- Chris Hedges, journalist
- Kevin Hernández, Democratic primary candidate for Hudson County Freeholder District 6
- Peter Jacob, social worker, Democratic candidate for Congress in New Jersey's 7th congressional district, 2016 and 2018
- Seth Kaper-Dale, pastor, activist, 2017 Green Party gubernatorial candidate in New Jersey
- Margaret Kimberley, activist, author, New York Green Party member
- Kason Little, social justice activist; Democratic primary candidate, Elizabeth City Council At-Large
- Lisa Savage, teacher, activist, Independent candidate for US Senate, Maine
- David Schraeger, peace activist
- Josh Shapiro, hub coordinator, Sunrise Montclair
- Cindy Sheehan, peace activist
- Jill Stein, physician, activist, and 2012 and 2016 Green Party presidential nominee
- Herb Tarbous, Democratic primary candidate for Middlesex County Clerk
- Bob Witanek, peace activist
- Stef Zamorano, co-producer, The Jimmy Dore Show

Radio

- 89.1 FM WHAR - Free Radio for the Free Thinker

Organizations

- Black Alliance for Peace
- Cats of Eastwick
- Green Party of Monmouth County
- Green Party of Ocean County
- Green Party US Latinx Caucus
- Young Ecosocialists Caucus - NJ

=== LaRouche was Right ===
==== Nominee ====
- Daniel Burke

=== Of, By, For! ===
==== Nominee ====
- Veronica Fernandez

=== Independents ===
==== Declared ====
- Luis Vergara (as a write-in candidate) (Note: General election write-in candidates have no barriers to, or deadlines for, qualification in New Jersey.)

== General election ==
=== Predictions ===
Source	Ranking	As of
The Cook Political Report	Safe D	October 29, 2020
Inside Elections	Safe D	October 28, 2020
Sabato's Crystal Ball	Safe D	November 2, 2020
Daily Kos	Safe D	October 30, 2020
Politico	Safe D	November 2, 2020
RCP	Likely D	October 23, 2020
DDHQ	Safe D	November 3, 2020
538	Safe D	November 2, 2020
Economist	Safe D	November 2, 2020

=== Additional general election endorsements ===
Cory Booker (D)

Senators

- Elizabeth Warren, U.S. senator (MA)

Local officials

- Amy DeGise, Hudson County Democratic Organization Chairwoman

Organizations

- Center for Biological Diversity
- Everytown for Gun Safety
- Working Families Party

Unions

- Health Professionals and Allied Employees
- National Education Association
Madelyn R. Hoffman (G)

Organizations

- Hummus JC

=== Polling ===
Poll source	Date(s) administered	Sample size (Note: Key: A – all adults RV – registered voters LV – likely voters V – unclear)	Margin of error	Cory Booker (D)	Rik Mehta (R)	Other / Undecided
Research Co.	October 31 – November 1, 2020	450 (LV)	± 4.6%	55%	32%	13% (Note: "Someone else" with 2%; Undecided with 11%)
Swayable	October 23–26, 2020	363 (LV)	± 6.7%	61%	39%	–
Rutgers University	October 19–24, 2020	851 (LV)	± 4%	61%	31%	9% (Note: "Someone else" and "Neither" with 2%; would not vote with 1%; Undecided with 4%)
Stockton University	October 7–13, 2020	721 (LV)	± 3.7%	57%	32%	10% (Note: "Other" with 7%; Undecided with 3%)
Emerson College	September 4–7, 2020	500 (LV)	± 4.4%	52%	28%	21% (Note: "Someone else" with 5%; Undecided with 16%)
Monmouth University	April 16–19, 2020	635 (RV)	± 3.9%	55%	32%	11% (Note: "Other" with 1%; "No one" with 0%; Undecided with 10%)

Hypothetical polling

with Hirsh Singh

Poll source	Date(s) administered	Sample size	Margin of error	Cory Booker (D)	Hirsh Singh (R)	Other / Undecided
Monmouth University	April 16–19, 2020	635 (RV)	± 3.9%	58%	33%	9% (Note: "Other" and "No one" with 0%; Undecided with 9%)

on whether or not respondents would vote to reelect Cory Booker

Poll source	Date(s) administered	Sample size	Margin of error	Yes	No	Undecided
Quinnipiac	April 30 – May 4, 2020	941 (RV)	± 3.2%	53%	36%	11%

=== Results ===
The election was not close, with Booker winning re-election by 16.31%. Key to Booker's landslide victory were heavily populated areas such as Hackensack, Newark, and Trenton. Mehta did well in Ocean County, which is a Republican stronghold, as well as many rural areas of the state. Booker received 2,541,239 votes. Booker was sworn in for a second term on January 3, 2021. His term will expire on January 3, 2027.

2020 United States Senate election in New Jersey
Party	Candidate	Votes	%	±%
Democratic	Cory Booker (incumbent)	2,541,239	57.23%	+1.39%
Republican	Rikin Mehta	1,817,091	40.92%	−1.41%
Green	Madelyn Hoffman	38,288	0.86%	+0.18%
Independent	Veronica Fernandez	32,290	0.73%	N/A
Independent	Daniel Burke	11,632	0.26%	N/A
Total votes		4,440,540	100.00%	N/A
Democratic hold				

==== By county ====
County	Cory Booker Democratic		Rikin Mehta Republican		Various candidates Other parties		Margin		Total votes cast
County	#	%	#	%	#	%	#	%	Total votes cast
Atlantic	71,420	52.64%	61,568	45.38%	2,690	1.98%	9,852	7.26%	135,678
Bergen	280,054	57.94%	195,193	40.38%	8,103	1.68%	84,861	17.56%	483,350
Burlington	150,160	58.76%	102,136	39.97%	3,250	1.27%	48,024	18.79%	255,546
Camden	173,335	66.30%	85,406	32.67%	2,700	1.03%	87,929	33.63%	261,441
Cape May	22,952	41.57%	31,317	56.72%	945	1.71%	-8,365	-15.15%	55,214
Cumberland	31,992	52.69%	26,626	43.85%	2,102	3.46%	5,366	8.84%	60,720
Essex	260,604	77.78%	69,750	20.82%	4,715	1.41%	190,854	56.96%	335,069
Gloucester	85,489	50.31%	80,943	47.64%	3,487	2.05%	4,546	2.68%	169,919
Hudson	176,658	73.57%	56,917	23.70%	6,538	2.72%	119,741	49.87%	240,113
Hunterdon	36,728	44.40%	43,951	53.13%	2,041	2.47%	-7,223	-8.73%	82,720
Mercer	117,821	68.26%	52,248	30.27%	2,527	1.46%	65,573	37.99%	172,596
Middlesex	221,802	60.61%	135,398	37.00%	8,727	2.38%	86,404	23.61%	365,927
Monmouth	173,609	46.62%	191,700	51.48%	7,045	1.89%	-18,091	-4.86%	372,354
Morris	146,148	50.23%	141,373	48.59%	3,453	1.19%	4,775	1.64%	290,974
Ocean	116,036	35.24%	207,751	63.09%	5,501	1.67%	-91,715	-27.85%	329,288
Passaic	131,195	60.01%	80,827	36.97%	6,593	3.02%	50,368	23.04%	218,615
Salem	14,515	43.28%	17,910	53.41%	1,111	3.31%	-3,395	-10.12%	33,536
Somerset	105,681	57.49%	75,622	41.14%	2,520	1.37%	30,059	16.35%	183,823
Sussex	33,919	39.29%	49,885	57.78%	2,525	2.92%	-15,966	-18.49%	86,329
Union	166,997	67.42%	76,677	30.96%	4,014	1.62%	90,320	36.47%	247,688
Warren	24,124	40.45%	33,893	56.83%	1,623	2.72%	-9,769	-16.38%	59,640
Totals	2,541,239	57.23%	1,817,091	40.92%	82,210	1.85%	724,148	16.31%	4,440,540

Counties that flipped from Republican to Democratic

- Morris (largest municipality: Parsippany)
- Somerset (largest municipality: Franklin Township)

==== By congressional district ====
Booker won nine out of 12 congressional districts in New Jersey, and Mehta won the other three, including one that elected a Democrat.

District	Booker	Mehta	Representative
1st	62%	36%	Donald Norcross
2nd	48%	50%	Jeff Van Drew
3rd	49.0%	49.4%	Andy Kim
4th	43%	55%	Chris Smith
5th	52%	46%	Josh Gottheimer
6th	58%	40%	Frank Pallone Jr.
7th	52%	46%	Tom Malinowski
8th	74%	24%	Albio Sires
9th	64%	33%	Bill Pascrell
10th	85%	13%	Donald Payne Jr.
11th	52%	47%	Mikie Sherrill
12th	66%	32%	Bonnie Watson Coleman

== See also ==
- 2020 New Jersey elections
