= 2020 United States House of Representatives elections in New Jersey =

- November 3, 2020

All 12 New Jersey seats to the United States House of Representatives
- Turnout: 72% (▲16pp)
	Majority party	Minority party
Party	Democratic	Republican
Last election	11	1
Seats before	10	2
Seats won	10	2
Seat change	Steady	Steady
Popular vote	2,539,128	1,843,047
Percentage	57.28%	41.58%
Swing	▼2.64%	▲2.9%

Democratic
50–60%
60–70%
70–80%
80–90%
Republican
50–60%
60–70%

The 2020 United States House of Representatives elections in New Jersey were held on November 3, 2020, to elect the 12 U.S. representatives from the state of New Jersey, one from each of the state's 12 congressional districts. The primary election in which candidates were chosen took place on July 7, 2020. The general election coincided with the 2020 U.S. presidential election, as well as other elections to the House of Representatives, elections to the United States Senate, and various state and local elections.

No seats changed parties, although Rep. Jeff Van Drew was re-elected as a Republican after switching parties earlier in the year.

== Overview ==
District	Democratic		Republican		Others		Total		Result
District	Votes	%	Votes	%	Votes	%	Votes	%	Result
District 1	240,567	62.48%	144,463	37.52%	0	0.00%	385,030	100.0%	Democratic hold
District 2	173,849	46.17%	195,526	51.93%	7,172	1.90%	376,547	100.0%	Republican hold
District 3	229,840	53.23%	196,327	45.47%	5,595	1.30%	431,762	100.0%	Democratic hold
District 4	162,420	38.27%	254,103	59.88%	7,845	1.85%	424,368	100.0%	Republican hold
District 5	225,175	53.15%	193,333	45.64%	5,128	1.21%	423,636	100.0%	Democratic hold
District 6	199,648	61.17%	126,760	38.83%	0	0.00%	326,408	100.0%	Democratic hold
District 7	219,688	50.61%	214,359	49.39%	0	0.00%	434,047	100.0%	Democratic hold
District 8	176,758	74.03%	58,686	24.58%	3,329	1.39%	238,773	100.0%	Democratic hold
District 9	203,674	65.80%	98,629	31.86%	7,239	2.34%	309,542	100.0%	Democratic hold
District 10	241,522	83.28%	40,298	13.90%	8,189	2.82%	290,009	100.0%	Democratic hold
District 11	235,163	53.30%	206,013	46.70%	0	0.00%	441,176	100.0%	Democratic hold
District 12	230,883	65.64%	114,591	32.58%	6,251	1.78%	351,725	100.0%	Democratic hold
Total	2,539,128	57.28%	1,843,047	41.58%	50,748	1.14%	4,432,923	100.0%	

Popular vote
Democratic	57.28%
Republican	41.58%
Other	1.14%

House seats
Democratic	83.33%
Republican	16.67%

== District 1 ==
2020 New Jersey's 1st congressional district election
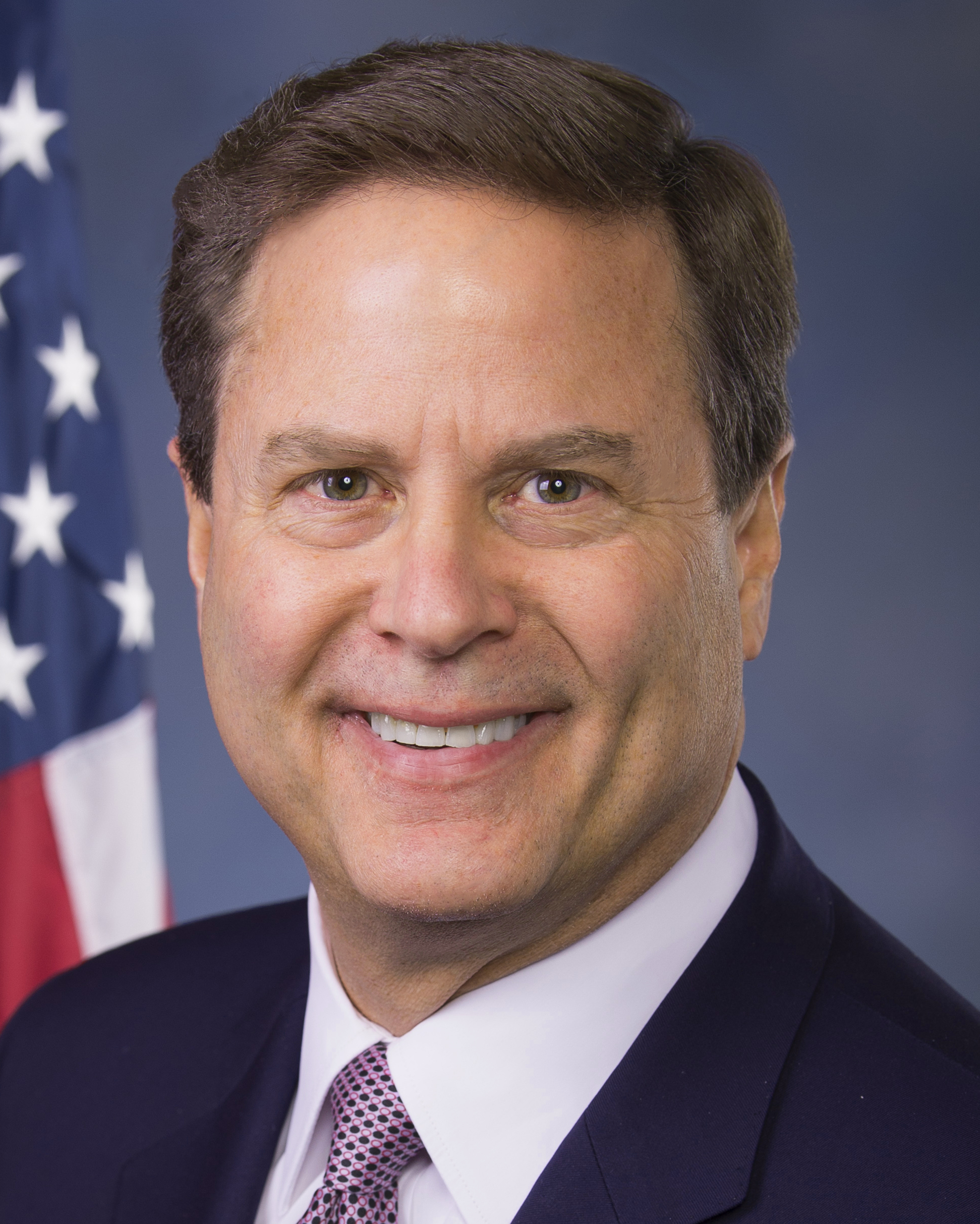

Nominee	Donald Norcross	Claire Gustafson
Party	Democratic	Republican
Popular vote	240,567	144,463
Percentage	62.5%	37.5%
- Norcross: 50–60% 60–70% 70–80% 80–90% >90% Gustafson: 50–60% >90%
U.S. Representative before election
Donald Norcross
Democratic
Elected U.S. Representative
Donald Norcross
Democratic

The 1st district is based in South Jersey and encompasses the inner Philadelphia suburbs including parts of Camden County along with parts of Burlington County and Gloucester County. The incumbent was Democrat Donald Norcross, who was re-elected with 64.4% of the vote in 2018.

=== Democratic primary ===
==== Candidates ====
===== Declared =====
- Donald Norcross, incumbent U.S. representative

===== Declined =====
- Sue Altman, executive director of the New Jersey Working Families Party

==== Primary results ====
Democratic primary results
Party	Candidate	Votes	%
Democratic	Donald Norcross (incumbent)	94,084	100.0
Total votes		94,084	100.0

=== Republican primary ===
==== Candidates ====
===== Declared =====
- Claire Gustafson, businesswoman and former Collingswood school board member

===== Withdrawn =====
- Josh Duvall, businessman

==== Primary results ====
Republican primary results
Party	Candidate	Votes	%
Republican	Claire Gustafson	27,616	100.0
Total votes		27,616	100.0

=== General election ===
==== Predictions ====
Source	Ranking	As of
The Cook Political Report	Safe D	October 21, 2020
Inside Elections	Safe D	October 28, 2020
Sabato's Crystal Ball	Safe D	October 20, 2020
Politico	Safe D	October 12, 2020
Daily Kos	Safe D	June 3, 2020
RCP	Safe D	June 9, 2020
Niskanen	Safe D	June 7, 2020

==== Results ====
New Jersey's 1st congressional district, 2020
Party	Candidate	Votes	%
Democratic	Donald Norcross (incumbent)	240,567	62.5
Republican	Claire Gustafson	144,463	37.5
Total votes		385,030	100.0
Democratic hold			

==== By county ====
County	Donald Norcross Democratic		Claire Gustafson Republican		Margin		Total votes cast
County	#	%	#	%	#	%	Total votes cast
Burlington (part)	8,004	61.6%	4,993	38.4%	3,011	23.2%	12,997
Camden (part)	170,632	66.7%	85,129	33.3%	85,503	33.4%	255,761
Gloucester (part)	61,931	53.3%	54,341	46.7%	7,590	6.6%	116,272
Totals	240,567	62.5%	144,463	37.5%	96,104	25.0%	385,030

== District 2 ==
2020 New Jersey's 2nd congressional district election
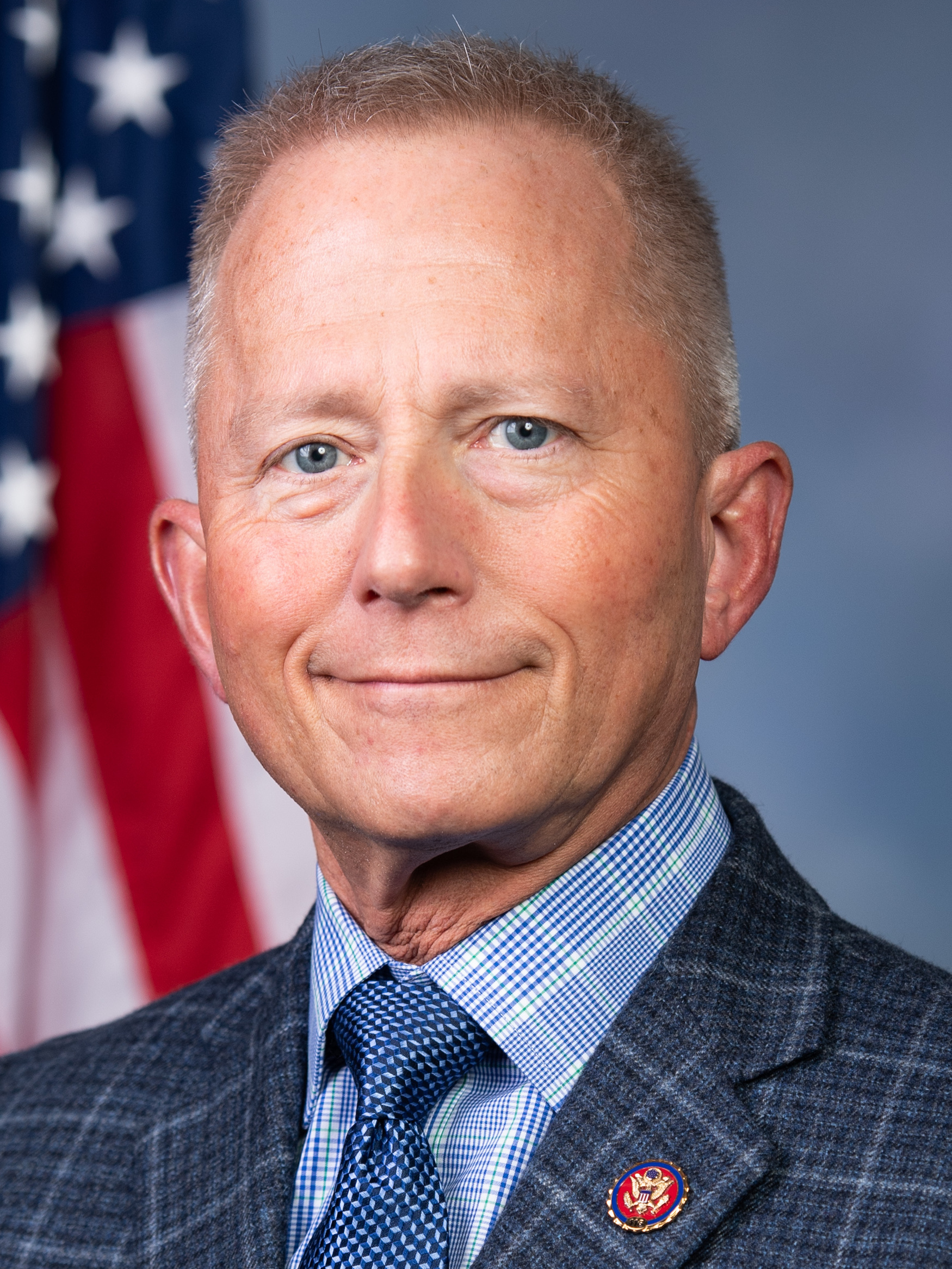

Nominee	Jeff Van Drew	Amy Kennedy
Party	Republican	Democratic
Popular vote	195,526	173,849
Percentage	51.9%	46.2%
- Van Drew: 50–60% 60–70% 70–80% Kennedy: 40–50% 50–60% 60–70% 70–80%
U.S. Representative before election
Jeff Van Drew
Republican
Elected U.S. Representative
Jeff Van Drew
Republican

The 2nd district is anchored in southern New Jersey coast, and includes all of Atlantic, Cumberland, and Salem counties, and parts of Burlington, Gloucester and Ocean counties. The incumbent was Republican Jeff Van Drew, who was elected in 2018 as a Democrat, flipping the district with 52.9% of the vote. On December 19, 2019, in a meeting with President Donald Trump, Vice President Mike Pence, and House Minority Leader Kevin McCarthy in the Oval Office, Van Drew announced that he had officially changed his party affiliation to the Republican Party.

=== Republican primary ===
==== Candidates ====
===== Declared =====
- Bob Patterson, former vice president for government relations at the United States Business and Industry Council and nominee for New Jersey's 1st congressional district in 2016
- Jeff Van Drew, incumbent U.S. representative

===== Withdrawn =====
- Brian T. Fitzherbert, defense contractor, project manager, engineer and former Atlantic County Young Republicans chairman
- David Richter, engineer, lawyer, businessman and former CEO of Hill International (ran in 3rd district instead)

===== Declined =====
- Chris A. Brown, state senator
- DiAnne Gove, state assemblywoman
- Seth Grossman, former Atlantic County freeholder and nominee for New Jersey's 2nd congressional district in 2018
- Hirsh Singh, engineer, candidate for New Jersey's 2nd congressional district in 2018, and candidate for governor in 2017 (ran for U.S. Senate)

==== Endorsements ====
Brian T. Fitzherbert

Organizations

- New Jersey Right to Life PAC
- Somers Point Regular Republican Club

State officials

- Sam Fiocchi, former assemblyman

Local officials

- Robert Campbell, Down Township mayor
- Erland Chau, Northfield mayor
- John Daddario, Upper Deerfield Township Committeeman
- Richard DePamphilis, Linwood mayor
- Anthony Fanucci, Vineland mayor
- Kirk Gerety, Somers Point councilman
- Jack Glasser, Somers Point mayor
- Beth Holtzman, Ventnor mayor
- Janice Johnston, Somers Point councilwoman
- Samuel Maccarone, Woolwich mayor
- Sean McGuigan, Somers Point Council president
- Michael Owen, Somers Point councilman
- Chris Seher, Absecon councilman
- Gregory Sykora, Somers Point Republican municipal leader
- Dennis Tapp, Somers Point councilman

Republican County Committee

- Maryetta Borkowski, Hamilton Township Republican County committeewoman
- Leonard Dagit, Egg Harbor Township Republican County committeeman
- Harry Rogers, Hamilton Township Republican County committeeman
- Paul Rosenberg, Egg Harbor Township Republican County committeeman
- Rodney Ruark, Absecon Republican County committeeman
- Gergory Seher, Absecon Republican County committeeman
- Kevin Smaniotto, Millville GOP County committeeman

Republican State Committee

- Barbara Capelli, Gloucester County State committeewoman
- William Fey, former Gloucester County GOP chairman & Gloucester County State committeeman

Individuals

- William Gruccio, Cumberland County Young Republicans chairman
- Joeseph Sarno, Young Republican Federation of New Jersey chairman
Bob Patterson

Organizations

- New Jersey Right to Life PAC (originally endorsed Brian Fitzherbert)
Jeff Van Drew

U.S. presidents

- Donald Trump, 45th president of the United States

Federal officials

- Chris Smith, U.S. representative (NJ-04)

Organizations

- Atlantic County Republican Committee
- Burlington County Republican Committee
- Camden County Republican Committee
- Cape May County GOP
- Cumberland County GOP
- Gloucester County GOP
- Ocean County GOP
- Salem County GOP

==== Primary results ====
Republican primary results
Party	Candidate	Votes	%
Republican	Jeff Van Drew (incumbent)	45,226	82.4
Republican	Bob Patterson	9,691	17.6
Total votes		54,917	100.0

=== Democratic primary ===
==== Candidates ====
===== Declared =====
- William Cunningham, chief investigator on the House Oversight Committee and candidate for New Jersey's 2nd congressional district in 2018
- John Francis, West Cape May commissioner
- Brigid Callahan Harrison, political science professor at Montclair State University
- Amy Kennedy, mental health advocate and wife of former U.S. Representative Patrick J. Kennedy
- Robert Turkavage, former FBI agent and Republican candidate for New Jersey's 2nd congressional district in 2018

===== Withdrew =====
- Ashley Bennett, Atlantic County freeholder

===== Declined =====
- Ray Batten, former New Jersey Superior Court judge
- Jack Surrency, Cumberland County freeholder
- Adam Taliaferro, state assemblyman

==== Endorsements ====
William Cunningham

U.S. senators

- Mike Gravel, former U.S. senator from Alaska (1969–1981); candidate for President in 2008 and 2020

Individuals

- Maya Rockeymoore Cummings, former Maryland Democratic Party chair (2018–2019)

Publications

- The Cape May Standard
- The Philadelphia Inquirer

Organizations

- African American Tobacco Control Leadership Council
- The Collective PAC
- Democracy for America
- GenERAtion Ratify
- The Gravel Institute
- LGBTQ Victory Fund
- Moms Demand Action
- Our Revolution Atlantic County
- Progressive Democrats of New Jersey
- The Solidarity Movement
- Sunrise Movement - South Jersey
Brigid Callahan Harrison

Federal officials

- Josh Gottheimer, U.S. representative (NJ-05)
- Albio Sires, U.S. representative (NJ-08)

State officials

- Gordon MacInnes, former education assistant commissioner (2002–2007), state senator (1994–1998), and state assemblyman (1974–1976)

Labor unions

- UNITE HERE, Local 54

Newspapers

- The Star-Ledger
Amy Kennedy

U.S. presidents

- Barack Obama, 44th president of the United States

U.S. vice presidents

- Joe Biden, 47th vice president of the United States (2009–2017), United States senator from Delaware (1973–2009), Democratic nominee for the 2020 election

Members of U.S. Congress

- David Cicilline, U.S. representative (RI-01)
- Steny Hoyer, U.S. representative (MD-05) and House majority leader
- Joe Kennedy III, U.S. representative (MA-4)

State executives

- Phil Murphy, governor of New Jersey, chair of the Democratic Governors Association (2019–present), U.S. ambassador to Germany (2009–2013)
- Sheila Oliver, lieutenant governor, former state assemblywoman (2004–2018) and state assembly speaker (2010–2014)

Labor unions

- AFL-CIO
- Communications Workers of America
- Communications Workers of America New Jersey Chapter
- National Education Association
- New Jersey Education Association (NJEA) PAC

Organizations

- Atlantic County Democratic Committee
- Congressional Hispanic Caucus Bold PAC
- End Citizens United
- Equality PAC
- League of Conservation Voters
- Let America Vote
- New Jersey CD 2 Progressive Democrats
- South Jersey Progressive Democrats
- Taking the Hill PAC

Individuals

- Martin Luther King III, civil rights activist
- Tanzira "Tanzie" Youngblood, Democratic candidate in NJ-02 in 2018

Political parties

- New Jersey Working Families Alliance
Hypothetical polling

with Jeff Van Drew (D) and Generic Democrat

Poll source	Date(s) administered	Sample size (Note: Key: A – all adults RV – registered voters LV – likely voters V – unclear)	Margin of error	Jeff Van Drew (D)	Generic Democrat	Undecided
TargetSmart/Ally Mutnick	Dec 7–10, 2019	391 (LV)	–	28%	58% (Note: Listed as "another Democrat should get the nomination" as opposed to "Van Drew deserves to be re-nominated")	14% (Note: Includes "refused")

==== Primary results ====
Democratic primary results
Party	Candidate	Votes	%
Democratic	Amy Kennedy	43,414	62.1
Democratic	Brigid Callahan Harrison	15,560	22.3
Democratic	William Cunningham	8,946	12.8
Democratic	John Francis	1,061	1.5
Democratic	Robert Turkavage	938	1.3
Total votes		69,919	100.0

=== General election ===
==== Debate ====
2020 New Jersey's 2nd congressional district debate
No.	Date	Host	Moderator	Link	Republican	Democratic
Key: P Participant A Absent N Not invited I Invited W Withdrawn						
Key: P Participant A Absent N Not invited I Invited W Withdrawn					Jeff Van Drew	Amy Kennedy
1	Oct. 8, 2020	NJTV; William J. Hughes Center for Public Policy at Stockton University	Briana Vannozzi		P	P

==== Predictions ====
Source	Ranking	As of
The Cook Political Report	Tossup	October 2, 2020
Inside Elections	Tilt D (flip)	October 28, 2020
Sabato's Crystal Ball	Lean D (flip)	November 2, 2020
Politico	Tossup	October 12, 2020
Daily Kos	Tossup	October 6, 2020
RCP	Tossup	October 5, 2020
Niskanen	Tossup	July 31, 2020

==== Polling ====
Poll source	Date(s) administered	Sample size	Margin of error	Jeff Van Drew (R)	Amy Kennedy (D)	Other	Undecided
Stockton University	October 22–27, 2020	676 (LV)	± 3.7%	45%	46%	3% (Note: "Another candidate" with 3%)	6%
Monmouth University	September 26 – October 1, 2020	588 (RV) (Note: Standard VI response)	± 4.1%	44%	49%	1% (Note: "Another candidate" with 1%; "No one" with 0%)	5%
Monmouth University	September 26 – October 1, 2020	588 (LV) (Note: In a high-turnout election)	± 4.1%	44%	50%	–	–
Monmouth University	September 26 – October 1, 2020	588 (LV) (Note: In a low-turnout election)	± 4.1%	44%	51%	–	–
ALG Research (D) (Note: Poll sponsored by Kennedy's campaign)	September 14–17, 2020	505 (LV)	± 4.4%	42%	46%	3% (Note: Ehrnstrom (L) with 2%; Harvey (I) with 1%)	9%
ALG Research (D)	September 14–17, 2020	505 (LV)	± 4.4%	44% (Note: If only Van Drew and Kennedy were candidates)	49%	–	–
Public Policy Polling (D) (Note: Poll conducted by the House Majority PAC.)	September 14–15, 2020	550 (V)	–	43%	48%	–	9%
GQR Research (D) (Note: Poll conducted by the DCCC, which seeks to elect Democratic Congressional candidates.)	August 4–6, 2020	400 (LV)	± 4.9%	46%	51%	–	–
Global Strategy Group (D)	August 1–5, 2020	400 (LV)	± 4.9%	45%	46%	–	9%
RMG Research	July 30 – August 5, 2020	500 (RV)	± 4.5%	42%	39%	–	19%
DCCC Targeting & Analytics Department (D)	June 30 – July 3, 2020	404 (LV)	± 4.9%	47%	44%	–	–

Hypothetical polling

with Generic Republican and Generic Democrat

Poll source	Date(s) administered	Sample size	Margin of error	Generic Republican	Generic Democrat	Undecided
Public Policy Polling (D)	September 14–15, 2020	550 (V)	–	44%	49%	7%
Global Strategy Group (D)	August 1–5, 2020	400 (LV)	± 4.9%	41%	44%	16%

with Jeff Van Drew (D) and Generic Opponent

Poll source	Date(s) administered	Sample size	Margin of error	Jeff Van Drew (D)	Generic Opponent	Undecided
TargetSmart	December 7–10, 2019	391 (LV)	–	24%	60% (Note: Listed as "Someone new should be given a chance" as opposed to "Van Drew deserves to be re-elected")	17%

==== Results ====
New Jersey's 2nd congressional district, 2020
Party	Candidate	Votes	%
Republican	Jeff Van Drew (incumbent)	195,526	51.9
Democratic	Amy Kennedy	173,849	46.2
Independent	Jenna Harvey	4,136	1.1
Libertarian	Jesse Ehrnstrom	3,036	0.8
Total votes		376,547	100.0
Republican hold			

==== By county ====
County	Jeff Van Drew Republican		Amy Kennedy Democratic		Various candidates Other parties		Margin		Total votes cast
County	#	%	#	%	#	%	#	%	Total votes cast
Atlantic	63,504	47.0%	69,566	51.4%	2,150	1.6%	-6,032	-4.4%	135,250
Burlington (part)	851	68.2%	371	29.8%	25	2.0%	480	48.4%	1,247
Camden (part)	3,458	56.8%	2,536	41.7%	91	1.5%	922	15.1%	6,085
Cape May	34,627	60.7%	21,899	38.4%	558	1.0%	12,728	22.3%	57,084
Cumberland	28,744	46.7%	31,266	50.8%	1,502	2.5%	-2,522	-4.1%	61,512
Gloucester (part)	27,930	52.2%	24,350	45.5%	1,264	2.3%	3,580	6.7%	53,544
Ocean (part)	16,311	61.9%	9,612	36.5%	444	1.7%	6,699	25.4%	26,367
Salem	18,251	54.3%	14,249	42.4%	1,138	3.4%	4,002	11.9%	33,638
Totals	195,526	51.9%	173,849	46.2%	7,172	1.9%	21,677	5.7%	376,547

== District 3 ==
2020 New Jersey's 3rd congressional district election
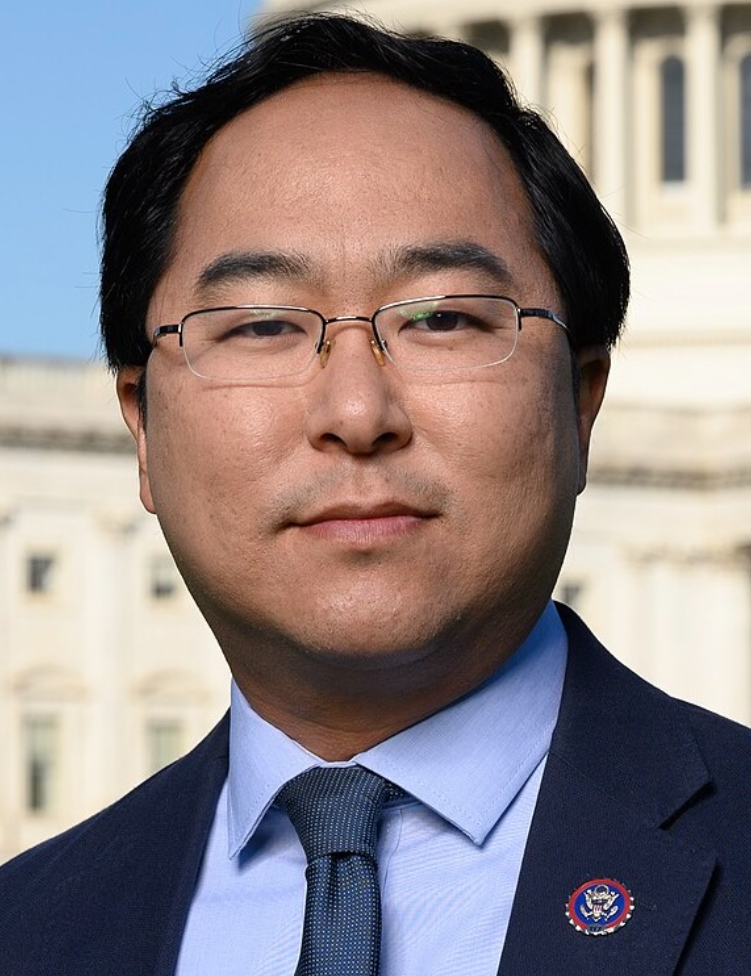

Nominee	Andy Kim	David Richter
Party	Democratic	Republican
Popular vote	229,840	196,327
Percentage	53.23%	45.47%
- Kim: 50–60% 60–70% 70–80% 90–100% Richter: 50–60% 60–70% 70–80%
U.S. Representative before election
Andy Kim
Democratic
Elected U.S. Representative
Andy Kim
Democratic

The 3rd district is based in central New Jersey, and includes parts of Burlington and Ocean counties. The incumbent was Democrat Andy Kim, who flipped the district and was elected with 50.0% of the vote in 2018.

=== Democratic primary ===
==== Candidates ====
===== Declared =====
- Andy Kim, incumbent U.S. representative

==== Endorsements ====
Andy Kim

U.S. presidents

- Barack Obama, 44th president of the United States

Organizations

- Asian American Action Fund
- Council for a Livable World
- End Citizens United
- Human Rights Campaign
- Humane Society of the United States Legislative Fund
- J Street PAC
- League of Conservation Voters Action Fund
- NARAL Pro-Choice America
- National Organization for Women
- Planned Parenthood Action Fund
- Progressive Change Campaign Committee
- Serve America PAC
- Sierra Club
- VoteVets

==== Primary results ====
Democratic primary results
Party	Candidate	Votes	%
Democratic	Andy Kim (incumbent)	79,417	100.0
Total votes		79,417	100.0

=== Republican primary ===
==== Candidates ====
===== Declared =====
- Kate Gibbs, former Burlington County freeholder
- David Richter, engineer, lawyer, and former CEO of Hill International

===== Withdrew =====
- John Novak, mayor of Barnegat (endorsed David Richter)
- Tony Porto, former mayor of Hainesport (endorsed David Richter)

===== Declined =====
- Dawn Addiego, state senator (switched to Democratic Party)
- Randy Brown, former mayor of Evesham Township
- Sean Earlen, chair of the Burlington County Republican Party (endorsed Kate Gibbs)
- Kim Guadagno, former lieutenant governor
- Jack Kelly, Ocean County freeholder and candidate for New Jersey's 3rd congressional district in 2008 (endorsed David Richter)
- Al Leiter, baseball analyst and former Major League Baseball pitcher
- Tom MacArthur, former U.S. representative (endorsed Kate Gibbs)
- Gregory P. McGuckin, state assemblyman (endorsed Kate Gibbs)
- Ryan Peters, state assemblyman (endorsed Kate Gibbs)
- Frank Sadeghi, businessman and Republican fundraiser

==== Endorsements ====
Kate Gibbs

Federal officials

- Tom MacArthur, former U.S. representative (NJ-03) (2015–2019)
- Kevin McCarthy, U.S. representative (CA-23) and House minority leader, former House majority leader (2014–2019)

State officials

- Diane Allen, former state senator (1998–2018), state senate deputy minority leader, and state assemblywoman (1996–1998)
- Jon Bramnick, state assemblyman and state assembly minority leader
- John Catalano, state assemblyman
- Kristin Corrado, state senator
- BettyLou DeCroce, state assemblywoman
- Serena DiMaso, state assemblywoman
- Aura K. Dunn, state assemblywoman
- James W. Holzapfel, state senator and former state assemblyman (1994–2012)
- Tom Kean, Jr., state senator and state senate minority leader, former state assemblyman (2001–2003)
- Gregory P. McGuckin, state assemblyman
- Nancy Munoz, state assemblywoman
- Ryan Peters, state assemblyman
- Holly Schepisi, state assemblywoman and state assembly deputy minority leader, former state assembly assistant minority leader (2018–2020)
- Jean Stanfield, state assemblywoman

Local officials

- Jim Borowski, Lavallette councilman
- Deborah Buzby-Cope, Bass River mayor
- Chris Chiacchio, former Moorestown mayor
- Gail Coleman, Seaside Park councilwoman
- Manny Delgado, former Moorestown mayor
- Joanne Filippone, Lavallette councilwoman
- Dave Finter, Lavallette councilman
- Phil Garwood, former Moorestown mayor
- Stacey Jordan, former Moorestown mayor and Burlington County freeholder
- Faith Liguori, Seaside Park councilwoman
- Mike Locatell, Moorestown councilman
- Victoria Napolitano, Moorestown councilwoman, former mayor (2015–2016) and deputy mayor (2016–2017)
- Judy Noonan, Berkeley Township councilwoman
- Tom Rolzhausen, South Toms River councilman
- Sandy Ross, South Toms River councilman
- Anita Zalom, Lavallette councilwoman

Publications

- The Philadelphia Inquirer

Organizations

- Burlington County Republican Committee
- Burlington County Young Republicans
- Maggie's List
- Moorestown Republican Municipal Committee
- Ocean County Republican Screening Committee
- Recreational Fishing Alliance
- Republican Main Street Partnership PAC
- Value in Electing Women PAC

Individuals

- Jamie Boren, Moorestown Republican Club president
- William Burns, Lavallette Republican Club president
- Vicki Chadwick, Young Republican Federation of New Jersey National committeewoman
- Sean Earlen, Burlington County Republican Organization chair, former Lumberton mayor
- Bill Gleason, South Toms River Republican Club president, South Toms River councilman
- Patricia Hoffman, Lavallette Republican Committee chair
- Linda Hughes, Burlington County Republican Organization vice chair and former freeholder
- Barbara Lanuto, Ocean County Republican Organization vice chair
- Vinny Napolitano, Moorestown Republican Committee chair
- Joe Sarno, Young Republican Federation of New Jersey chair
David Richter

State officials

- Christopher J. Brown, former state assemblyman (2012–2015)
- Christopher J. Connors, state senator and former state assemblyman (1990–2008) (originally endorsed Kate Gibbs)
- DiAnne Gove, state assemblywoman (originally endorsed Kate Gibbs)
- Maria Rodriguez-Gregg, former state assemblywoman (2014–2018)
- Robert W. Singer, state senator and state senate deputy minority leader, former state assemblyman (1986–1990, 1992–1993)

Local officials

- Carmen Amato, mayor of Berkeley Township
- Ken Baulderstone, mayor of Ocean Township
- Scott Colabella, Ocean County clerk
- Lawrence Cuneo, mayor of Pine Beach
- E. Steven Doyle, mayor of Island Heights
- Virginia E. Haines, Ocean County freeholder, Republican National Committee member, and former state assemblywoman (1992–1994)
- Mo Hill, mayor of Toms River
- Jack Kelly, Ocean County freeholder
- Paul Kennedy, mayor of Ocean Gate
- Steve Kennis, mayor of Lacey
- Walter LaCicero, mayor of Lavallette
- Gerry Little, Ocean County freeholder
- Mike Mastronardy, Ocean County sheriff
- Jack McGinnis, former mayor of Tabernacle
- Greg Myrhe, mayor of Stafford
- John Novak, mayor of Barnegat
- John Peterson, mayor of Seaside Park
- Anthony Porto, former mayor of Hainesport
- Gary Quinn, Ocean County freeholder deputy director
- Ron Roma, mayor of Beachwood
- Robert Sabosik, mayor of Point Pleasant
- Tony Vaz, mayor of Seaside Heights
- Joe Vicari, Ocean County freeholder director
- Lance White, mayor of Mantoloking

Organizations

- Barnegat Township Republican Club
- Berkeley Township Republican Club
- Brick Township Republican Club
- Lacey Township Republican Club
- NRA Political Victory Fund
- Ocean County Republican Organization
- Ocean Township (Waretown) Republican Club
- Stafford Conservative Republican Club
- Toms River Republican Club

Individuals

- Frank Holman, Ocean County Republican Organization chair

==== Primary results ====
Republican primary results
Party	Candidate	Votes	%
Republican	David Richter	35,824	61.1
Republican	Kate Gibbs	22,768	38.9
Total votes		58,592	100.0

=== General election ===
==== Predictions ====
Source	Ranking	As of
The Cook Political Report	Likely D	November 2, 2020
Inside Elections	Safe D	October 29, 2020
Sabato's Crystal Ball	Likely D	October 20, 2020
Politico	Lean D	November 2, 2020
Daily Kos	Tossup	June 3, 2020
RCP	Tossup	June 9, 2020
Niskanen	Lean D	June 7, 2020

Complete video of debate

==== Polling ====
Poll source	Date(s) administered	Sample size	Margin of error	Andy Kim (D)	David Richter (R)	Undecided
Basswood Research (R) (Note: Poll sponsored by the Congressional Leadership Fund, which is a PAC that supports federal Republican candidates.)	July 13 – 15, 2020	400 (LV)	± 4.9%	45%	42%	–

==== Results ====
New Jersey's 3rd congressional district, 2020
Party	Candidate	Votes	%
Democratic	Andy Kim (incumbent)	229,840	53.23
Republican	David Richter	196,327	45.47
Independent	Martin Weber	3,724	0.86
Independent	Robert Shapiro	1,871	0.43
Total votes		431,762	100.00
Democratic hold			

==== By county ====
County	Andy Kim Democratic		David Richter Republican		Various candidates Other parties		Margin		Total votes cast
County	#	%	#	%	#	%	#	%	Total votes cast
Burlington (part)	150,932	62.3%	89,332	36.8%	2,189	0.9%	61,600	25.5%	242,455
Ocean (part)	78,908	41.7%	106,995	56.5%	3,404	1.3%	−28,807	−14.8%	189,307
Totals	229,840	53.2%	196,327	45.5%	5,595	1.3%	33,513	7.7%	431,762

== District 4 ==
2020 New Jersey's 4th congressional district election
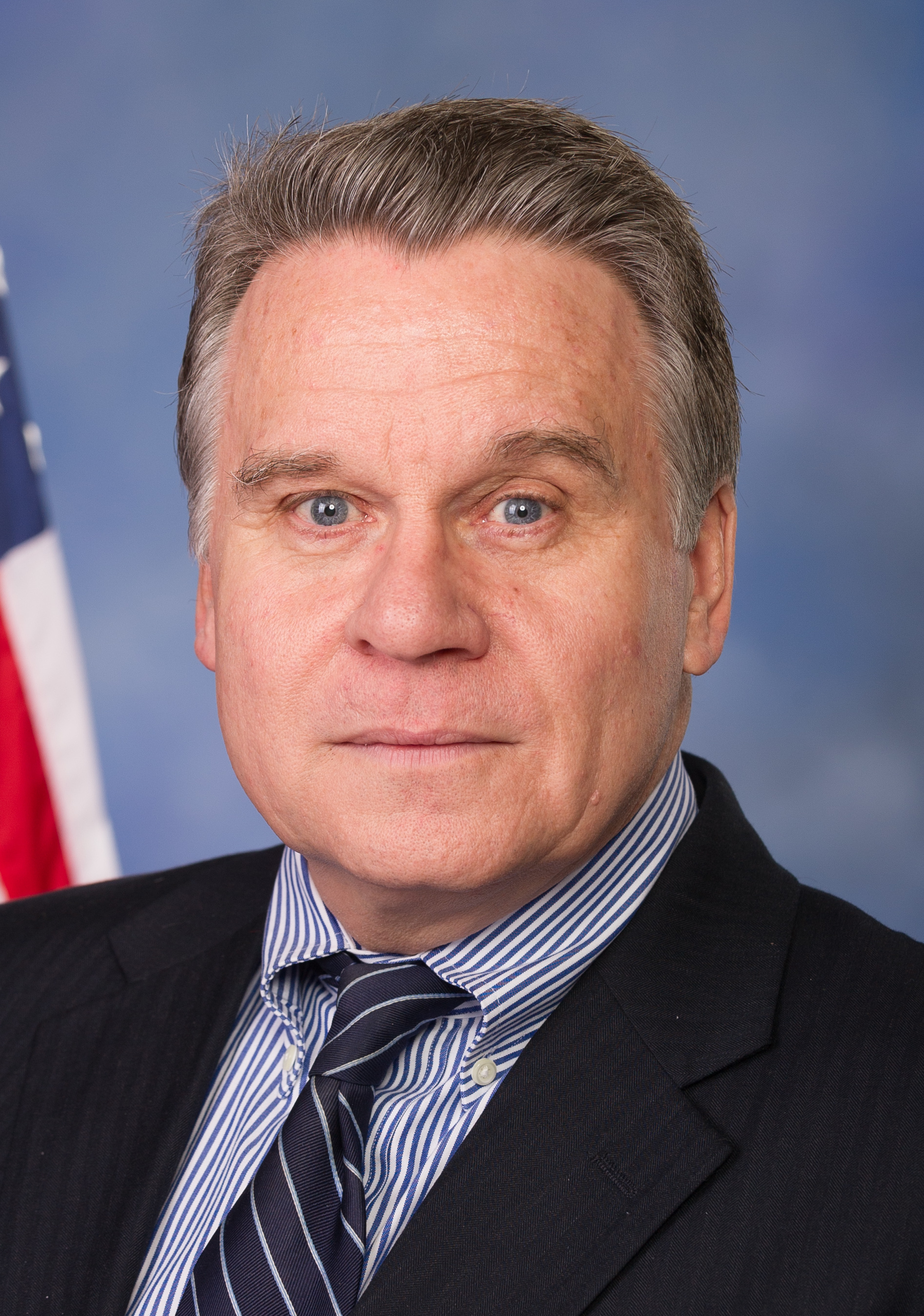

Nominee	Chris Smith	Stephanie Schmid
Party	Republican	Democratic
Popular vote	254,103	162,420
Percentage	59.9%	38.3%
- Smith: 40–50% 50–60% 60–70% 70–80% 80–90% Schmid: 40–50% 50–60% 60–70%
U.S. Representative before election
Chris Smith
Republican
Elected U.S. Representative
Chris Smith
Republican

The 4th district encompasses parts of Mercer, Monmouth and Ocean counties. The incumbent was Republican Chris Smith, who was re-elected with 55.4% of the vote in 2018.

=== Republican primary ===
==== Candidates ====
===== Declared =====
- Alter Richter, rabbi
- Chris Smith, incumbent U.S. representative

==== Primary results ====
Republican primary results
Party	Candidate	Votes	%
Republican	Chris Smith (incumbent)	51,636	94.8
Republican	Alter Richter	2,853	5.2
Total votes		54,489	100.0

=== Democratic primary ===
==== Candidates ====
===== Declared =====
- David Applefield, retired journalist
- Christine Conforti, holistic life coach and former United Nations staffer
- Stephanie Schmid, human rights activist

===== Withdrew =====
- Tiffany Kaszuba, lobbyist
- Jim Keady, former Asbury Park city councilman (2005–2008)
- Hassan Shehadeh, financial analyst

==== Endorsements ====
Christine Conforti

Individuals

- Georgia Cassidy, vice chair and club president of the Point Pleasant Beach Democratic Party
- Don Rodgers, municipal chairman of the Point Pleasant Beach Democratic Party

Organizations

- Mercer County Democratic Party
Stephanie Schmid

Federal officials

- Sen. Cory Booker, U.S. senator from New Jersey
- Rep Tom Malinowski, U.S. representative (NJ-7)
- Rep. Seth Moulton (MA-6), founder of Serve America
- Rep Frank Pallone, U.S. representative (NJ-6)

State officials

- Joann Downey, assemblywoman (LD-11)
- Erin Wheeler, former candidate for state assembly, LD-10

Local officials

- Angela Ahbez-Anderson, Asbury Park Municipal vice chair
- Mike Benson, Ocean County municipal chair
- Scott Berlin, president of the Freehold Township Democrats and former Freehold Township Committee candidate
- Susan Boyce, Rumson municipal chair
- Matt Cohen, Little Silver municipal chair
- Liz deBeer, Fair Haven municipal chair
- Joan Gotti, Little Silver municipal vice chair and Little Silver Democratic Club president
- Josh Hodes, Sea Girt municipal chair
- Janice Iwanyk, Howell municipal vice chair
- Cristina Kocsis, Neptune City municipal chair
- Marissa Lambert, Ocean County municipal vice chair
- Steve Lozowick, Bradley Beach municipal chair
- Tricia Maguire, Middletown Democratic committeewoman
- Mike Mangan, Manasquan municipal chair
- Maria Rondinaro, Belmar municipal chair
- Patricia Sheehan, Avon municipal chair and former mayor of East Brunswick
- Meg Thomann, Freehold Township municipal chair
- Patricia Troise, Manchester municipal chair
- Ed Wolff, Point Pleasant Borough municipal chair

Individuals

- David Brown, Democratic chairman, Monmouth County Democrats
- Steve Clayton, Monmouth County Democratic committeeman
- Gene Davis, former councilman, Jackson
- Josh Welle, 2018 Democratic congressional nominee

Organizations

- Bradley Beach Democratic Committee
- Little Silver Democratic Club
- Manalapan Democratic Committee
- Moms Demand Action Candidate Distinction
- Ocean Township Democratic Committee
- Rumson Democratic Committee
- Serve America

==== Primary results ====
Democratic primary results
Party	Candidate	Votes	%
Democratic	Stephanie Schmid	38,444	67.4
Democratic	Christine Conforti	14,331	25.1
Democratic	David Applefield	4,244	7.5
Total votes		57,019	100.0

=== General election ===
==== Predictions ====
Source	Ranking	As of
The Cook Political Report	Safe R	July 2, 2020
Inside Elections	Safe R	June 2, 2020
Sabato's Crystal Ball	Safe R	July 2, 2020
Politico	Likely R	April 19, 2020
Daily Kos	Safe R	June 3, 2020
RCP	Safe R	June 9, 2020
Niskanen	Safe R	June 7, 2020

Complete video of debate

==== Endorsements ====
Chris Smith

U.S. executive branch officials

- Donald Trump, 45th president of the United States

==== Results ====
New Jersey's 4th congressional district, 2020
Party	Candidate	Votes	%
Republican	Chris Smith (incumbent)	254,103	59.9
Democratic	Stephanie Schmid	162,420	38.3
Independent	Hank Schroeder	3,195	0.7
Libertarian	Michael Rufo	2,583	0.6
Independent	Andrew Pachuta	2,067	0.5
Total votes		424,368	100.0
Republican hold			

==== By county ====
County	Chris Smith Republican		Stephanie Schmid Democratic		Various candidates Other parties		Margin		Total votes cast
County	#	%	#	%	#	%	#	%	Total votes cast
Mercer (part)	29,298	51.8%	26,329	46.6%	904	1.7%	2,969	5.2%	56,531
Monmouth (part)	142,013	56.6%	103,600	41.3%	5,294	2.2%	38,413	15.3%	250,907
Ocean (part)	82,792	70.8%	32,491	27.8%	1,647	1.4%	50,301	43.0%	116,930
Totals	254,103	59.9%	162,420	38.3%	7,845	1.8%	92,683	21.6%	424,368

== District 5 ==
2020 New Jersey's 5th congressional district election
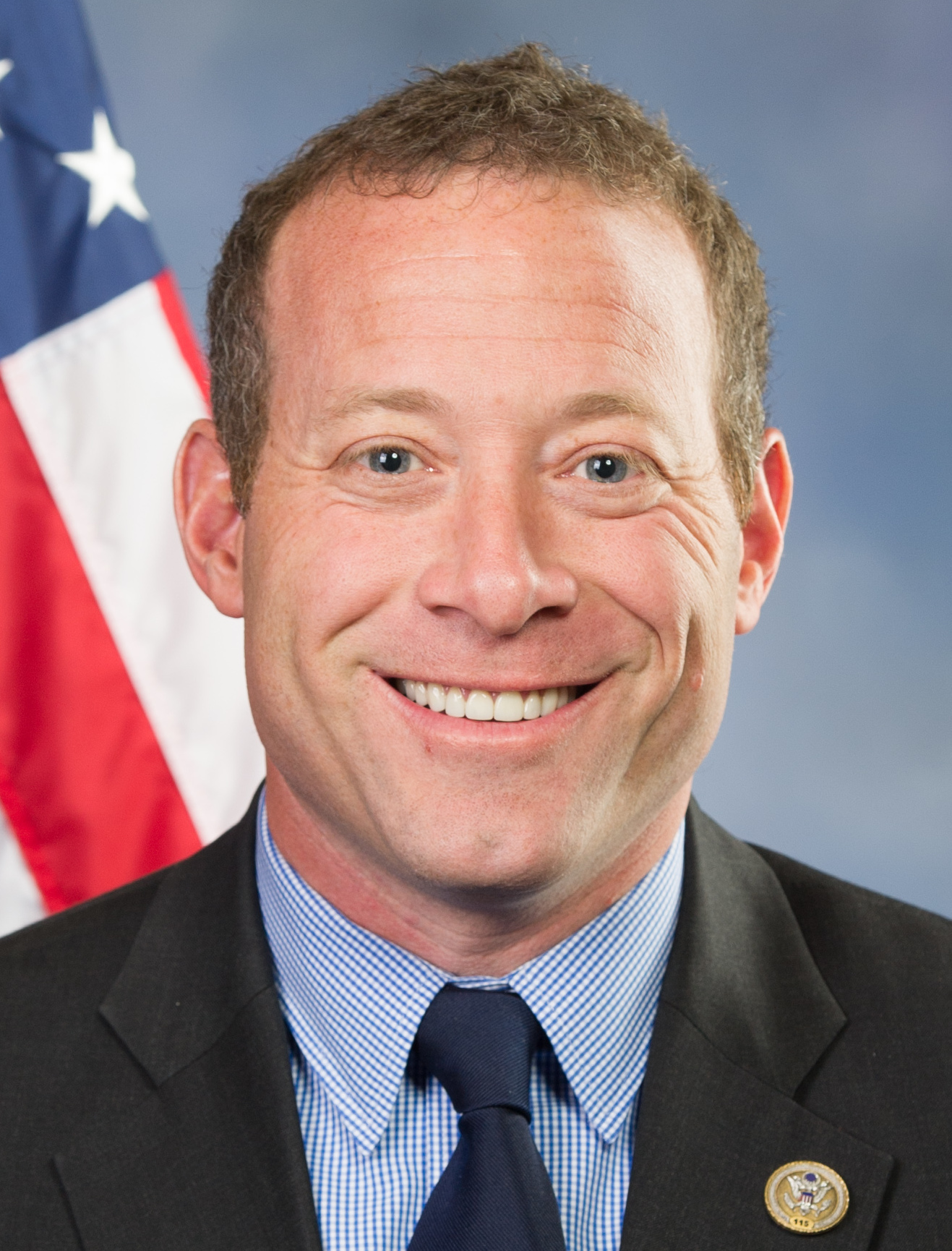

Nominee	Josh Gottheimer	Frank Pallotta
Party	Democratic	Republican
Popular vote	225,175	193,333
Percentage	53.2%	45.6%
- Gottheimer: 50–60% 60–70% 70–80% Pallotta: 40–50% 50–60% 60–70% 70–80%
U.S. Representative before election
Josh Gottheimer
Democratic
Elected U.S. Representative
Josh Gottheimer
Democratic

The 5th district is based in northern New Jersey, and includes parts of Bergen County and portions of Passaic, Sussex and Warren counties. The incumbent was Democrat Josh Gottheimer, who was re-elected with 56.2% of the vote in 2018.

=== Democratic primary ===
==== Candidates ====
===== Declared =====
- Josh Gottheimer, incumbent U.S. representative
- Arati Kreibich, Glen Rock borough councilwoman

==== Endorsements ====
Josh Gottheimer

U.S. presidents

- Barack Obama, 44th president of the United States

U.S. senators

- Cory Booker, U.S. senator from New Jersey

U.S. representatives

- Hakeem Jeffries, U.S. representative (NY-08) and House Democratic Caucus chair
- Nancy Pelosi, U.S. representative (CA-12) and House speaker
- Mikie Sherrill, U.S. representative (NJ-11)

State executives

- Phil Murphy, governor of New Jersey

State officials

- Valerie Huttle, state assemblywoman
- Gordon M. Johnson, state assemblyman and state assembly speaker pro tempore
- Joseph Lagana, state senator and former state assemblyman (2014–2018)
- Lisa Swain, state assemblywoman and former mayor of Fair Lawn
- Chris Tully, state assemblyman
- Loretta Weinberg, state senator and state senate majority leader, former state assemblywoman (1992–2005)

Organizations

- Bergen County Democratic Committee
- Congressional Black Caucus (CBC) PAC
- Democratic Majority for Israel (DMFI) PAC
- End Citizens United
- Everytown for Gun Safety Action Fund
- Humane Society Legislative Fund
- Jewish Democratic Council of America
- National Education Association (NEA)
- New Jersey Education Association (NJEA)
- Planned Parenthood Action Fund
- Sierra Club

Individuals

- John Currie, New Jersey Democratic State Committee chair
- Balpreet Grewal-Virk, Bergen County Democratic Organization vice chair
- Paul Juliano, Bergen County Democratic Committee chair
- Tom Palmieri, Warren County Democratic Committee chair
- Katie Rotondi, Sussex County Democratic Committee chair
Arati Kreibich

Federal officials

- Ayanna Pressley, U.S. representative (MA-07)

Organizations

- #VOTEPROCHOICE
- Common Defense
- Demand Universal Healthcare (DUH)
- Food & Water Action
- Friends of the Earth Action
- Indivisible
- Moms in Office
- National Iranian American Council
- New Jersey Working Families Alliance
- Our Revolution New Jersey Chapter
- Progressive Change Campaign Committee
- Progressive Democrats of America
- Progressive Rising
- South Asians for America
- Sunrise Movement (national)

==== Polling ====
Poll source	Date(s) administered	Sample size	Margin of error	Josh Gottheimer	Arati Kreibich
TargetSmart (D) (Note: Poll sponsored by Gottheimer's campaign)	June 17–18, 2020	– (LV) (Note: Not yet released)	± 4.9%	66%	23%
Data for Progress	May 17, 2020	368 (LV)	± 5.1%	64%	17%

==== Primary results ====
Democratic primary results
Party	Candidate	Votes	%
Democratic	Josh Gottheimer (incumbent)	52,406	66.5
Democratic	Arati Kreibich	26,418	33.5
Total votes		78,824	100.0

=== Republican primary ===
==== Candidates ====
===== Declared =====
- James Baldini, educator
- Hector Castillo
- John McCann, former Cresskill borough councilman and nominee for New Jersey's 5th congressional district in 2018
- Frank Pallotta, former investment banker

===== Withdrawn =====
- Bob Auth, state assemblyman
- Jon Dalrymple Jr., student
- Dana DiRisio, former aide to U.S. Representative Scott Garrett
- Paul Duggan, candidate for Bergen County executive in 2018 (running as New Jersey Conservative Party candidate)
- Mike Ghassali, mayor of Montvale
- John C. Glidden, mayor of Closter

===== Declined =====
- Michael J. Doherty, state senator
- Tim Luing, businessman
- Holly Schepisi, state assemblywoman
- Parker Space, state assemblyman

==== Endorsements ====
Mike Ghassali (withdrawn)

Individuals

- Joe Piscopo, actor, comedian, and radio talk show host
- Bill Spadea, radio talk show host

Organizations

- New York Young Republican Club
John McCann

Local officials

- Steven Rogers, America Winning Coalition president, former Nutley commissioner of public affairs (2012–2020), and Republican candidate in 2017 New Jersey gubernatorial election
Frank Pallotta

U.S. executive branch officials

- Donald Trump, 45th president of the United States

State officials

- Gerald Cardinale, state senator, former state senate deputy majority leader (1994–2002) and assistant minority leader (1987–1989) and state assemblyman (1980–1982)
- Kristin Corrado, state senator
- BettyLou DeCroce, state assemblywoman
- John DiMaio, state assemblyman and former mayor of Hackettstown (1991–1999)
- Joseph Pennacchio, state senator and former state assemblyman (2001–2008)
- Holly Schepisi, state assemblywoman and state assembly deputy minority leader, former assistant minority leader (2018–2020)

Local officials

- Michele Dale, mayor of West Milford Township
- Stan Kula, mayor of Hardyston
- Roger Lane, former mayor of New Milford
- Jim Perry, Hardwick Township committeeman
- Carlos Rendo, mayor of Woodcliff Lake and 2017 Republican lieutenant gubernatorial nominee
- John Roth, mayor of Mahwah
- John Ruocco, mayor of Hillsdale
- John Sowden, mayor of Franklin Borough
- Mike Strada, Sussex County sheriff
- Ann Subrizi, former mayor of New Milford

Organizations

- New Jersey Right to Life PAC

Individuals

- Tony Shaffer, retired U.S. Army Reserve lieutenant colonel

==== Primary results ====
Republican primary results
Party	Candidate	Votes	%
Republican	Frank Pallotta	25,834	51.7
Republican	John McCann	16,220	32.4
Republican	James Baldini	5,126	10.3
Republican	Hector Castillo	2,814	5.6
Total votes		49,994	100.0

=== General election ===
==== Predictions ====
Source	Ranking	As of
The Cook Political Report	Safe D	November 2, 2020
Inside Elections	Safe D	June 2, 2020
Sabato's Crystal Ball	Safe D	July 2, 2020
Politico	Likely D	October 3, 2020
Daily Kos	Safe D	June 3, 2020
RCP	Likely D	June 9, 2020
Niskanen	Safe D	June 7, 2020

Hypothetical polling

with John McCann

Poll source	Date(s) administered	Sample size	Margin of error	Josh Gottheimer (D)	John McCann (R)	Undecided
Cygnal/InsiderNJ	January 23–26, 2020	400 (LV)	± 4.9%	39%	40%	21%

with Mike Ghassali

Poll source	Date(s) administered	Sample size	Margin of error	Josh Gottheimer (D)	Mike Ghassali (R)	Undecided
Cygnal/InsiderNJ	January 23–26, 2020	400 (LV)	± 4.9%	44%	43%	13%

==== Results ====
New Jersey's 5th congressional district, 2020
Party	Candidate	Votes	%
Democratic	Josh Gottheimer (incumbent)	225,175	53.2
Republican	Frank Pallotta	193,333	45.6
Independent	Louis Vellucci	5,128	1.2
Total votes		423,636	100.0
Democratic hold			

==== By county ====
County	Josh Gottheimer Democratic		Frank Pallotta Republican		Louis Vellucci Independent		Margin		Total votes cast
County	#	%	#	%	#	%	#	%	Total votes cast
Bergen (part)	177,378	58.2%	124,748	40.9%	2,906	1.0%	52,630	17.3%	305,032
Passaic (part)	9,629	42.2%	12,749	55.8%	453	2.0%	−3,120	−13.6%	22,831
Sussex (part)	22,363	39.3%	33,455	58.8%	1,049	1.8%	−11,092	−19.5%	56,867
Warren (part)	15,805	40.6%	22,381	57.5%	720	1.9%	−6,576	−16.9%	38,906
Totals	225,175	53.2%	193,333	45.6%	5,128	1.2%	31,842	6.6%	423,636

== District 6 ==
2020 New Jersey's 6th congressional district election
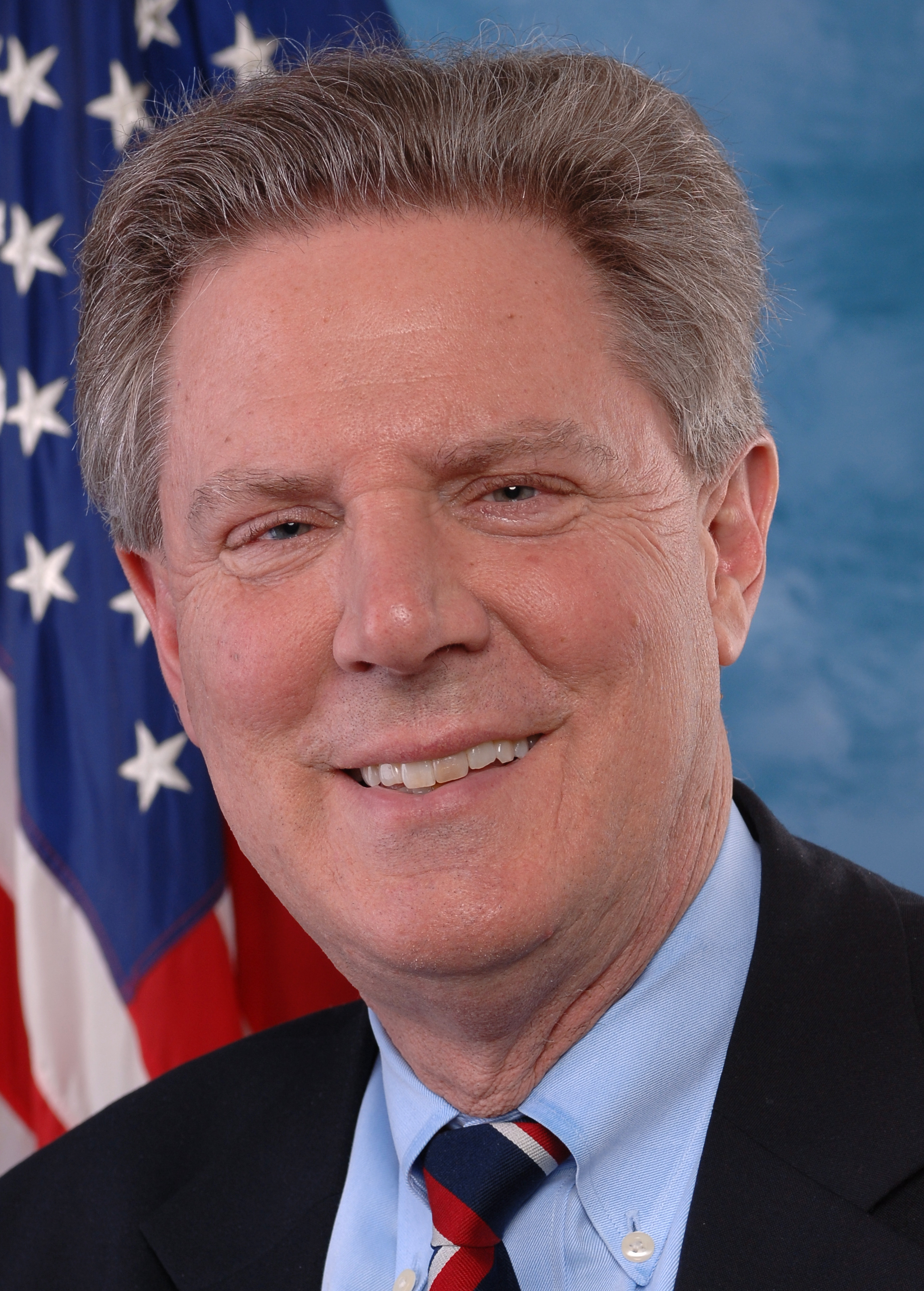

Nominee	Frank Pallone	Christian Onuoha
Party	Democratic	Republican
Popular vote	199,648	126,760
Percentage	61.2%	38.8%
- Pallone: 50–60% 60–70% 70–80% 80–90% Onuoha: 50–60% 70–80%
U.S. Representative before election
Frank Pallone
Democratic
Elected U.S. Representative
Frank Pallone
Democratic

The 6th district encompasses northern Middlesex County and parts of Monmouth County, including New Brunswick and Long Branch. The incumbent was Democrat Frank Pallone, who was re-elected with 63.6% of the vote in 2018.

=== Democratic primary ===
==== Candidates ====
===== Declared =====
- Amani al-Khatahtbeh, founder of MuslimGirl.com
- Russ Cirincione, attorney and trade unionist
- Frank Pallone, incumbent U.S. representative

===== Withdrew =====
- John Hsu
- Javahn Walker, candidate in 2018

==== Endorsements ====
Russ Cirincione

Organizations

- American Progressives in STEM
- Center for Biological Diversity Action Fund (co-endorsed with Amani al-Khatahtbeh)
- Demand Universal Healthcare (DUH)
- Force the Issue NJ
- Friends of the Earth Action (co-endorsed with Amani al-Khatahtbeh)
- Humanity Forward
- Progressive Rising
- Public Arts Commission

Individuals

- Andrew Yang, 2020 Democratic presidential candidate
Amani al-Khatahtbeh

Organizations

- Center for Biological Diversity Action Fund (co-endorsed with Russ Cirincione)
- Friends of the Earth Action (co-endorsed with Russ Cirincione)
Frank Pallone

Organizations

- Humane Society Legislative Fund
- Planned Parenthood Action Fund
- Sierra Club

==== Primary results ====
Democratic primary results
Party	Candidate	Votes	%
Democratic	Frank Pallone Jr. (incumbent)	56,660	79.2
Democratic	Russ Cirincione	12,139	17.0
Democratic	Amani al-Khatahtbeh	2,743	3.8
Total votes		71,542	100.0

=== Republican primary ===
Republican candidates Sammy Gindi and Christian Onuoha filed challenges against each other's petitions and as a result both were removed from the primary ballot; however, both continued to campaign as write-in candidates in the primary.

==== Candidates ====
===== Declared =====
- Sammy Gindi, entrepreneur
- Christian Onuoha, candidate for New Jersey General Assembly in 2019

==== Primary results ====
Republican primary results
Party	Candidate	Votes	%
Republican	Christian Onuoha (write-in)	508	100.0
Total votes		508	100.0

=== General election ===
==== Predictions ====
Source	Ranking	As of
The Cook Political Report	Safe D	July 2, 2020
Inside Elections	Safe D	June 2, 2020
Sabato's Crystal Ball	Safe D	July 2, 2020
Politico	Safe D	April 19, 2020
Daily Kos	Safe D	June 3, 2020
RCP	Safe D	June 9, 2020
Niskanen	Safe D	June 7, 2020

==== Results ====
New Jersey's 6th congressional district, 2020
Party	Candidate	Votes	%
Democratic	Frank Pallone Jr. (incumbent)	199,648	61.2
Republican	Christian Onuoha	126,760	38.8
Total votes		326,408	100.0
Democratic hold			

==== By county ====
County	Frank Pallone Democratic		Christian Onuoha Republican		Margin		Total votes cast
County	#	%	#	%	#	%	Total votes cast
Middlesex (part)	136,280	66.3%	69,414	33.7%	66,866	32.6%	205,694
Monmouth (part)	63,368	52.5%	57,346	47.5%	6,022	5.0%	120,714
Totals	199,648	61.2%	126,760	38.8%	72,888	22.4%	326,408

== District 7 ==
2020 New Jersey's 7th congressional district election
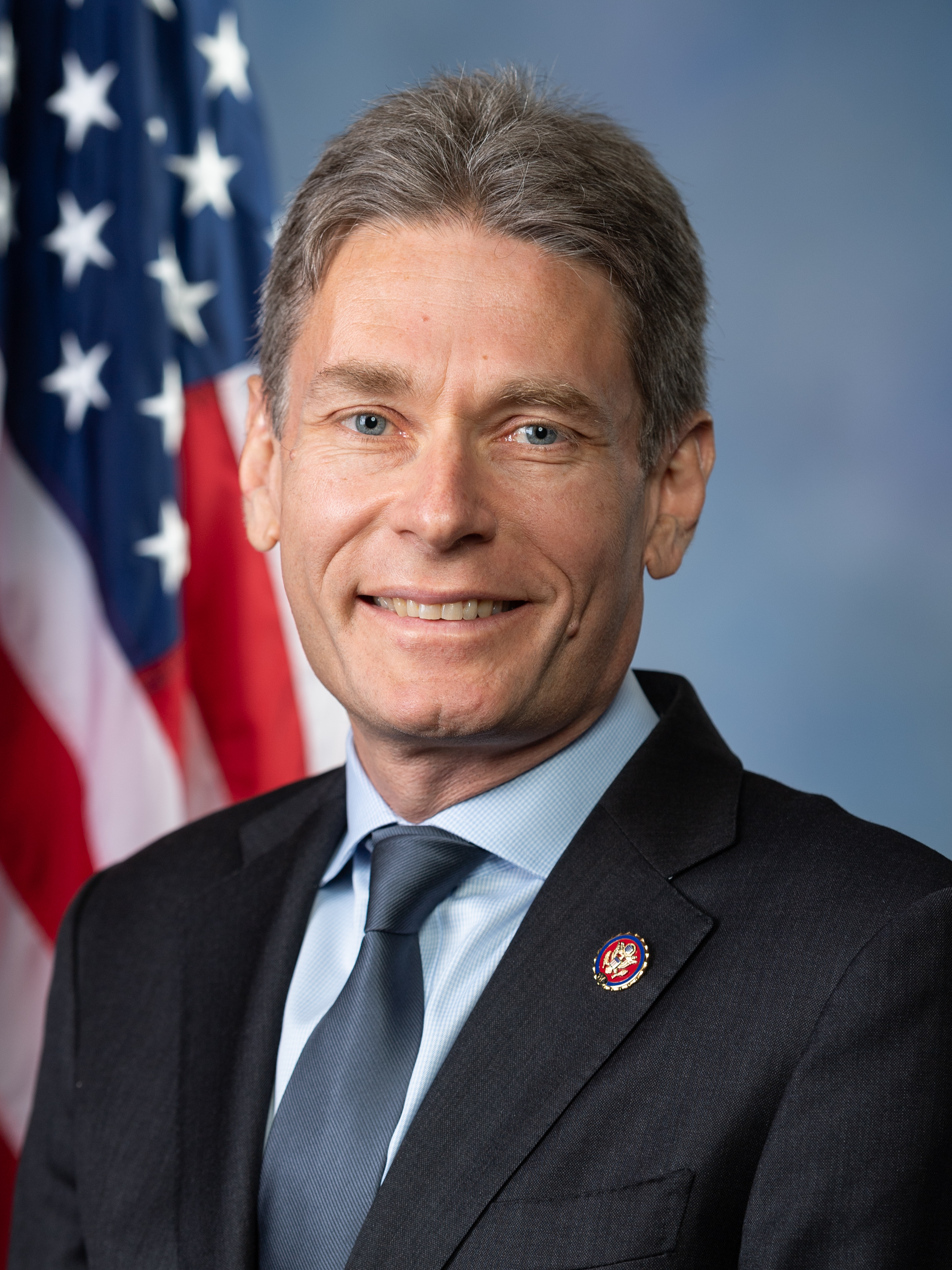

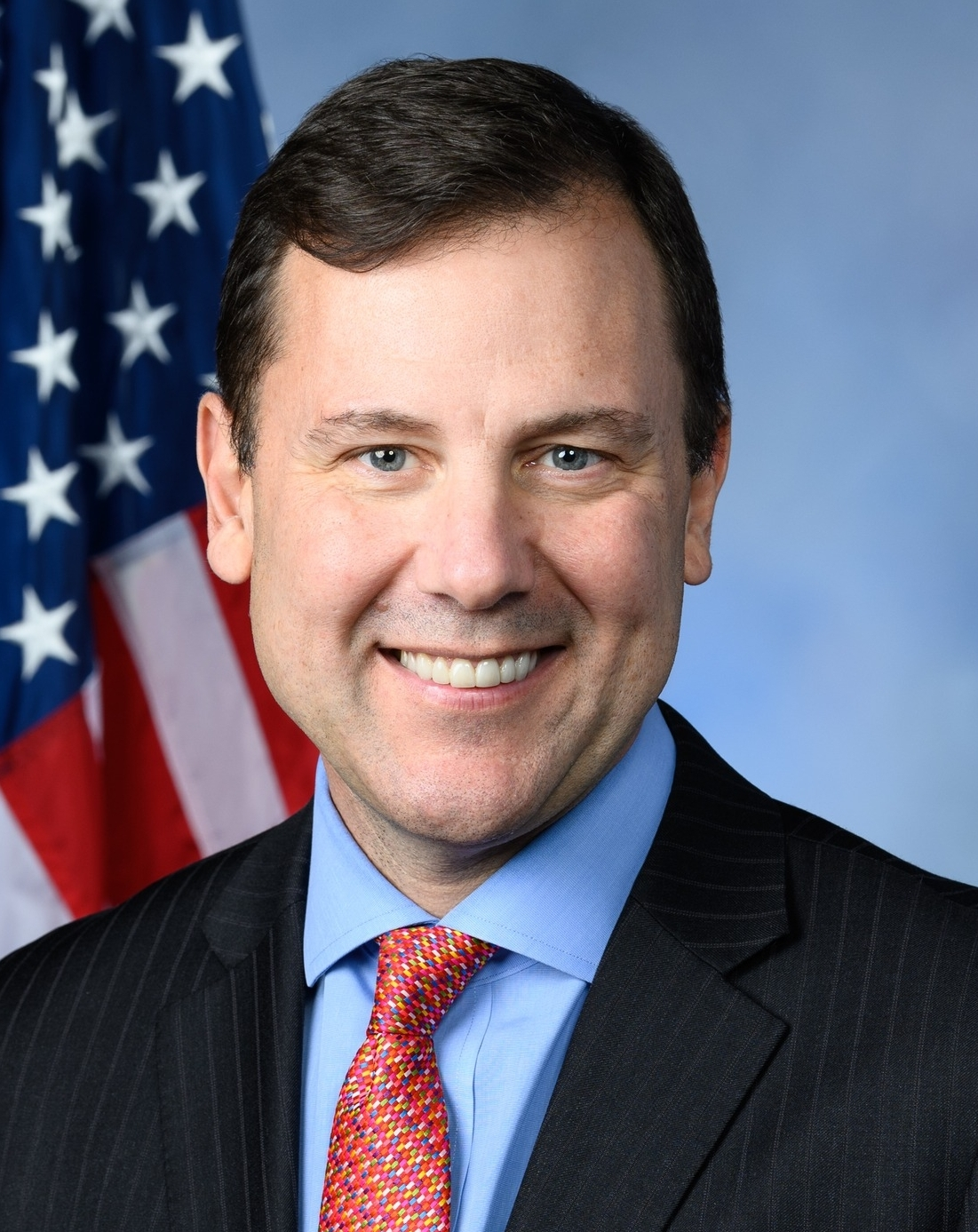
Nominee	Tom Malinowski	Thomas Kean Jr.
Party	Democratic	Republican
Popular vote	219,688	214,359
Percentage	50.6%	49.4%
- Malinowski: 50–60% 60–70% 70–80% Kean: 50–60% 60–70%
U.S. Representative before election
Tom Malinowski
Democratic
Elected U.S. Representative
Tom Malinowski
Democratic

The 7th district is based in north-central New Jersey, and includes portions of Morris, Warren, Union, Somerset, Essex and all of Hunterdon County. The incumbent was Democrat Tom Malinowski, who flipped the district and was elected with 51.7% of the vote in 2018.

=== Democratic primary ===
==== Candidates ====
===== Declared =====
- Tom Malinowski, incumbent U.S. representative

==== Endorsements ====
Tom Malinowski

U.S. presidents

- Barack Obama, 44th president of the United States

Organizations

- Human Rights Campaign
- Humane Society Legislative Fund
- J Street PAC
- League of Conservation Voters Action Fund
- National Iranian American Council
- NARAL Pro-Choice America
- National Organization for Women
- Planned Parenthood Action Fund
- Serve America PAC
- Sierra Club

==== Primary results ====
Democratic primary results
Party	Candidate	Votes	%
Democratic	Tom Malinowski (incumbent)	80,334	100.0
Total votes		80,334	100.0

=== Republican primary ===
==== Candidates ====
===== Declared =====
- Raafat Barsoom, physician and candidate for New Jersey's 7th congressional district in 2018
- Thomas Kean Jr., minority leader of the New Jersey Senate
- Tom Phillips, human resources executive

===== Withdrawn =====
- Rosemary Becchi, tax attorney and nonprofit executive (running for the 11th congressional district)

===== Declined =====
- Michael J. Doherty, state senator
- Matt Holt, Hunterdon County freeholder
- Kathy Hugin, philanthropist and former Wall Street bond trader
- Leonard Lance, former U.S. representative
- David Larsen, businessman and candidate for New Jersey's 7th congressional district in 2010, 2012, 2014, and 2016
- Nancy Munoz, state assemblywoman
- Colin Newman, business executive
- Erik Peterson, state assemblyman
- Jason Sarnoski, Warren County freeholder
- Dana DiRisio, former aide to U.S. Representative Scott Garrett
- Tim Smith, former mayor of Roxbury Township
- Doug Steinhardt, chairman of the New Jersey Republican State Committee

==== Endorsements ====
Thomas Kean Jr.

Federal officials

- Liz Cheney, U.S. representative from Wyoming's at-large district
- Kevin McCarthy, U.S. House minority leader
- Steve Scalise, U.S. House Minority Whip

State and local officials

- Kip Bateman, state senator
- Jack Ciattarelli, former state assemblyman and candidate for governor in 2017
- Matthew Holt, Hunterdon County freeholder
- Thomas Kean, former chairman of the 9/11 Commission, former governor (1982–1990), former state assemblyman, candidate's father
- Suzanne Lagay, Hunterdon County freeholder
- John Lanza, Hunterdon County freeholder
- Mary Melfi, Hunterdon County clerk
- Zach Rich, Hunterdon County freeholder
- Susan Soloway, Hunterdon County freeholder
- Shaun Van Doren, Hunterdon County freeholder

Party chairs

- Patrick Torpey, chair of the Hunterdon County Republican Party

Organizations

- The New York Young Republican Club
- United States Chamber of Commerce

==== Primary results ====
Republican primary results
Party	Candidate	Votes	%
Republican	Thomas H. Kean Jr.	45,395	79.4
Republican	Raafat Barsoom	6,151	10.8
Republican	Tom Phillips	5,631	9.8
Total votes		57,177	100.0

=== General election ===
==== Debates ====
Complete video of debate, September 13, 2020.

==== Predictions ====
Source	Ranking	As of
The Cook Political Report	Lean D	July 2, 2020
Inside Elections	Likely D	October 29, 2020
Sabato's Crystal Ball	Lean D	July 2, 2020
Politico	Lean D	October 12, 2020
Daily Kos	Tossup	June 3, 2020
RCP	Lean D	June 9, 2020
Niskanen	Safe D	June 7, 2020

==== Polling ====
Poll source	Date(s) administered	Sample size	Margin of error	Tom Malinowski (D)	Thomas Kean Jr. (R)	Other	Undecided
Basswood Research (R)	March 10–11, 2020	400 (LV)	± 4.9%	38%	39%	0%	23%
NRCC (R) (Note: Poll sponsored by the National Republican Congressional Committee)	June 24–26, 2019	400 (LV)	–	42%	44%	1%	13%

Hypothetical polling

with generic Republican

Poll source	Date(s) administered	Sample size	Margin of error	Tom Malinowski (D)	Generic Republican	Undecided
NRCC (R)	June 24–26, 2019	400 (LV)	–	42%	44%	13%

==== Results ====
New Jersey's 7th congressional district, 2020
Party	Candidate	Votes	%
Democratic	Tom Malinowski (incumbent)	219,688	50.6
Republican	Thomas H. Kean Jr.	214,359	49.4
Total votes		434,047	100.0
Democratic hold			

==== By county ====
County	Tom Malinowski Democratic		Thomas Kean Jr. Republican		Margin		Total votes cast
County	#	%	#	%	#	%	Total votes cast
Essex (part)	7,625	66.1%	3,904	33.9%	3,721	32.2%	11,529
Hunterdon	36,815	44.2%	46,443	55.8%	-9,628	-11.6%	83,258
Morris (part)	32,400	46.8%	26,838	53.2%	-4,438	-6.4%	69,238
Somerset (part)	73,466	53.0%	65,153	47.0%	8,313	6.0%	138,619
Union (part)	60,532	54.7%	50,191	45.3%	10,341	9.4%	110,723
Warren (part)	8,791	42.7%	11,789	57.3%	-2,998	-14.6%	20,580
Totals	219,629	50.6%	214,318	49.4%	5,311	1.2%	433,947

== District 8 ==
2020 New Jersey's 8th congressional district election
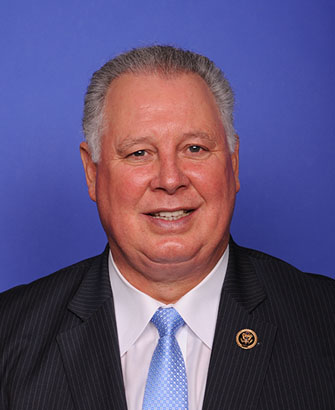

Nominee	Albio Sires	Jason Mushnick
Party	Democratic	Republican
Popular vote	176,758	58,686
Percentage	74.0%	24.6%
- Sires: 60–70% 70–80% 80–90%
U.S. Representative before election
Albio Sires
Democratic
Elected U.S. Representative
Albio Sires
Democratic

The 8th district is based in North Jersey encompassing parts of Bergen, Essex, Hudson and Union counties. The incumbent was Democrat Albio Sires, who was re-elected with 78.1% of the vote in 2018.

=== Democratic primary ===
==== Candidates ====
===== Declared =====
- Hector Oseguera, lawyer
- Will Sheehan, former U.S. Navy SEAL intelligence officer
- Albio Sires, incumbent U.S. representative

==== Withdrew ====
- Jonathan Munitz, financial consultant (endorsed Hector Oseguera)

==== Endorsements ====
Hector Oseguera

Local officials

- James Solomon, Jersey City councilman
- John Thieroff, former Jersey City deputy mayor (2013–2014)

Organizations

- Blue America
- The Climate Mobilization Hoboken
- Demand Universal Healthcare (DUH)
- Force the Issue NJ
- Hudson County DSA
- NJ-08 for Progress
- The Solidarity Caucus
- Working Families Alliance
- Youth Climate Strike - New Jersey

Individuals

- Jonathan Munitz, 2020 Democratic candidate in NJ-08
Will Sheehan

Organizations

- Pier Truckers Association
- Port Driver Association
Albio Sires

Federal officials

- Cory Booker, U.S. senator from New Jersey
- Bob Menendez, U.S. senator from New Jersey

State officials

- Annette Chaparro, assemblywoman, District 33
- Nicholas Chiaravalloti, assemblyman, District 31
- Sandra Bolden Cunningham, state senator, District 31
- Angelica M. Jimenez, assemblywoman, District 32
- Angela McKnight, assemblywoman, District 31
- Pedro Mejia, assemblyman, District 32
- Raj Mukherji, assemblyman, District 33
- Phil Murphy, governor
- Sheila Oliver, lieutenant governor, former state assemblywoman (2004–2018) and state assembly speaker (2010–2014)
- Nicholas Sacco, state senator, District 32, mayor of North Bergen, former assistant superintendent of North Bergen School District
- Brian P. Stack, state senator, District 33, mayor of Union City

Local officials

- Ravi Bhalla, mayor of Hoboken
- Diane Coleman, Hudson County register
- Jimmy Davis, mayor of Bayonne
- Amy DeGise, Hudson County Democratic Organization chairwoman
- Tom DeGise, Hudson County executive
- James Fife, mayor of Harrison
- Steve Fulop, mayor of Jersey City
- Mike Gonnelli, mayor of Secaucus
- Dina Grilo, mayor of East Newark
- E. Junior Maldonado, Hudson County Clerk
- Bill O'Dea, Hudson County freeholder
- Gabrien Rodriguez, mayor of West New York
- Yousef Saleh, Jersey City councilman
- Al Santos, mayor of Kearny
- Frank X. Schillari, Hudson County sheriff
- Richard Turner, mayor of Weehawken
- Wayne Zitt, mayor of Guttenberg

Organizations

- Hudson County Democratic Organization, Hudson County's chapter of the New Jersey Democratic State Committee
- Hudson County Latino Caucus
- Humane Society Legislative Fund
- Planned Parenthood Action Fund
- Sierra Club

==== Primary results ====
Democratic primary results
Party	Candidate	Votes	%
Democratic	Albio Sires (incumbent)	47,814	70.3
Democratic	Hector Oseguera	18,557	27.3
Democratic	Will Sheehan	1,612	2.4
Total votes		67,983	100.0

=== Republican primary ===
==== Candidates ====
===== Declared =====
- Jason Mushnick, attorney and candidate for New Jersey General Assembly in 2019

===== Withdrew =====
- David Winkler

==== Primary results ====
Republican primary results
Party	Candidate	Votes	%
Republican	Jason Mushnick	5,899	100.0
Total votes		5,899	100.0

=== General election ===
==== Predictions ====
Source	Ranking	As of
The Cook Political Report	Safe D	July 2, 2020
Inside Elections	Safe D	June 2, 2020
Sabato's Crystal Ball	Safe D	July 2, 2020
Politico	Safe D	April 19, 2020
Daily Kos	Safe D	June 3, 2020
RCP	Safe D	June 9, 2020
Niskanen	Safe D	June 7, 2020

==== Results ====
New Jersey's 8th congressional district, 2020
Party	Candidate	Votes	%
Democratic	Albio Sires (incumbent)	176,758	74.0
Republican	Jason Mushnick	58,686	24.6
Libertarian	Dan Delaney	3,329	1.4
Total votes		238,773	100.0
Democratic hold			

==== By county ====
County	Albio Sires Democratic		Jason Mushnick Republican		Dan Delaney Libertarian		Margin		Total votes cast
County	#	%	#	%	#	%	#	%	Total votes cast
Bergen (part)	2,336	64.7%	1,230	34.1%	46	1.3%	1,106	30.6%	3,612
Essex (part)	30,689	74.3%	10,333	25.0%	208	0.7%	20,356	49.3%	41,330
Hudson (part)	120,156	74.0%	39,346	24.2%	2,783	1.7%	80,810	49.8%	162,285
Union (part)	23,577	74.7%	7,777	24.7%	192	0.6%	15,800	50.0%	31,546
Totals	176,758	74.0%	58,686	24.6%	3,329	1.4%	118,072	49.4%	238,773

== District 9 ==
2020 New Jersey's 9th congressional district election
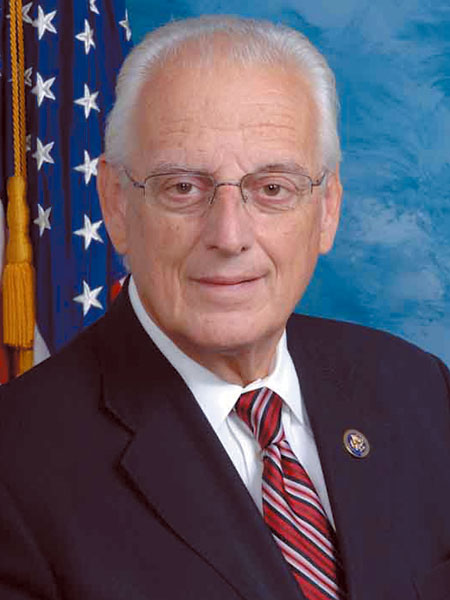

Nominee	Bill Pascrell	Billy Prempeh
Party	Democratic	Republican
Popular vote	203,674	98,629
Percentage	65.8%	31.9%
- Pascrell: 50–60% 60–70% 70–80% 80–90% Prempeh: 50–60%
U.S. Representative before election
Bill Pascrell
Democratic
Elected U.S. Representative
Bill Pascrell
Democratic

The 9th district encompasses parts of Bergen, Passaic and Hudson counties. The incumbent was Democrat Bill Pascrell, who was re-elected with 70.3% of the vote in 2018.

=== Democratic primary ===
==== Candidates ====
===== Declared =====
- Alp Basaran, corporate lawyer
- Bill Pascrell, incumbent U.S. representative
- Zinovia Spezakis, finance and clean energy executive, environmental activist

==== Endorsements ====
Bill Pascrell

State officials

- Annette Chaparro, assemblywoman, District 33
- Nicholas Chiaravalloti, assemblyman, District 31
- Sandra Bolden Cunningham, state senator, District 31
- Angelica M. Jimenez, assemblywoman, District 32
- Angela McKnight, assemblywoman, District 31
- Pedro Mejia, assemblyman, District 32
- Raj Mukherji, assemblyman, District 33
- Nicholas Sacco, state senator, District 32, mayor of North Bergen, former assistant superintendent of North Bergen School District
- Brian P. Stack, state senator, District 33, mayor of Union City

Local officials

- Ravi Bhalla, mayor of Hoboken
- Diane Coleman, Hudson County register
- Jimmy Davis, mayor of Bayonne
- Amy DeGise, Hudson County Democratic Organization chairwoman
- Tom DeGise, Hudson County executive
- James Fife, mayor of Harrison
- Steve Fulop, mayor of Jersey City
- Mike Gonnelli, mayor of Secaucus
- Dina Grilo, mayor of East Newark
- E. Junior Maldonado, Hudson County clerk
- Gabrien Rodriguez, mayor of West New York
- Al Santos, mayor of Kearny
- Frank X. Schillari, Hudson County sheriff
- Richard Turner, mayor of Weehawken
- Wayne Zitt, mayor of Guttenberg

Organizations

- Brady Campaign
- Hudson County Democratic Organization, Hudson County's chapter of the New Jersey Democratic State Committee
- Humane Society Legislative Fund
- League of Conservation Voters Action Fund
- Planned Parenthood Action Fund
- Sierra Club
Zinovia Spezakis

Organizations

- American Progressives in STEM
- Forward Thinking Democracy
- Our Revolution Passaic County
- Progressive Democrats of America
- Progressive Democrats of New Jersey
- Progressive Rising
- Sunrise Movement Columbia
- Sunrise Movement Morris County

==== Primary results ====
Democratic primary results
Party	Candidate	Votes	%
Democratic	Bill Pascrell Jr. (incumbent)	52,422	80.6
Democratic	Zinovia Spezakis	10,998	16.9
Democratic	Alp Basaran	1,592	2.5
Total votes		65,012	100.0

=== Republican primary ===
==== Candidates ====
===== Declared =====
- Billy Prempeh, U.S. Air Force veteran
- Tim Walsh, vice chairman of the Bergen County Young Republicans

==== Primary results ====
Republican primary results
Party	Candidate	Votes	%
Republican	Billy Prempeh	10,055	74.2
Republican	Tim Walsh (Unofficially withdrew)	3,500	25.8
Total votes		13,555	100.0

=== General election ===
==== Predictions ====
Source	Ranking	As of
The Cook Political Report	Safe D	July 2, 2020
Inside Elections	Safe D	June 2, 2020
Sabato's Crystal Ball	Safe D	July 2, 2020
Politico	Safe D	April 19, 2020
Daily Kos	Safe D	June 3, 2020
RCP	Safe D	June 9, 2020
Niskanen	Safe D	June 7, 2020

==== Results ====
New Jersey's 9th congressional district, 2020
Party	Candidate	Votes	%
Democratic	Bill Pascrell Jr. (incumbent)	203,674	65.8
Republican	Billy Prempeh	98,629	31.9
Independent	Chris Auriemma	7,239	2.3
Total votes		309,542	100.0
Democratic hold			

==== By county ====
County	Bill Pascrell Democratic		Billy Prempeh Republican		Chris Auriemma Independent		Margin		Total votes cast
County	#	%	#	%	#	%	#	%	Total votes cast
Bergen (part)	104,655	60.8%	63,711	37.0%	3,837	2.2%	40,944	23.8%	172,203
Hudson (part)	9,672	59.8%	6,005	37.1%	493	3.0%	3,667	22.7%	16,710
Passaic (part)	89,347	73.7%	28,913	23.9%	2,909	2.4%	60,434	49.8%	121,169
Totals	203,674	65.8%	98,629	31.9%	7,239	2.3%	105,045	33.9%	309,542

== District 10 ==
2020 New Jersey's 10th congressional district election
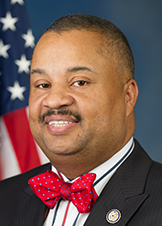

Nominee	Donald Payne Jr.	Jennifer Zinone
Party	Democratic	Republican
Popular vote	241,522	40,298
Percentage	83.3%	13.9%
- Payne: 50–60% 60–70% 70–80% 80–90% >90%
U.S. Representative before election
Donald Payne Jr.
Democratic
Elected U.S. Representative
Donald Payne Jr.
Democratic

The 10th district encompasses parts of Essex, Hudson and Union counties. The incumbent was Democrat Donald Payne Jr., who was reelected with 87.6% of the vote in 2018.

=== Democratic primary ===
==== Candidates ====
===== Declared =====
- John J. Flora, teacher
- Eugene Mazo, law professor at Rutgers Law School
- Donald Payne Jr., incumbent U.S. representative

==== Endorsements ====
Donald Payne Jr.

State officials

- Annette Chaparro, assemblywoman, District 33
- Nicholas Chiaravalloti, assemblyman, District 31
- Sandra Bolden Cunningham, state senator, District 31
- Angelica M. Jimenez, assemblywoman, District 32
- Angela McKnight, assemblywoman, District 31
- Pedro Mejia, assemblyman, District 32
- Raj Mukherji, assemblyman, District 33
- Nicholas Sacco, state senator, District 32, mayor of North Bergen, former assistant superintendent of North Bergen School District
- Brian P. Stack, state senator, District 33, Mayor of Union City

Local officials

- Ravi Bhalla, mayor of Hoboken
- Diane Coleman, Hudson County register
- Jimmy Davis, mayor of Bayonne
- Amy DeGise, Hudson County Democratic Organization chairwoman
- Tom DeGise, Hudson County executive
- James Fife, mayor of Harrison
- Steve Fulop, mayor of Jersey City
- Mike Gonnelli, mayor of Secaucus
- Dina Grilo, mayor of East Newark
- E. Junior Maldonado, Hudson County clerk
- Gabrien Rodriguez, mayor of West New York
- Al Santos, mayor of Kearny
- Frank X. Schillari, Hudson County sheriff
- Richard Turner, mayor of Weehawken
- Wayne Zitt, mayor of Guttenberg

Organizations

- Hudson County Democratic Organization, Hudson County's chapter of the New Jersey Democratic State Committee
- Humane Society Legislative Fund
- Planned Parenthood Action Fund
- Sierra Club
John Flora

Unions

- Pier Trucker Association
- Port Driver Association

Organizations

- American Descendants of Slavery
- Blue Media Project
- Generation Ratify New Jersey
- Sunrise Movement - Union County chapter

==== Primary results ====
Democratic primary results
Party	Candidate	Votes	%
Democratic	Donald Payne Jr. (incumbent)	83,436	88.5
Democratic	Eugene Mazo	6,653	7.0
Democratic	John J. Flora	4,239	4.5
Total votes		94,328	100.0

=== Republican primary ===
==== Candidates ====
===== Declared =====
- Jennifer Zinone, freelance copywriter

===== Withdrew =====
- Michael W. Barret
- Ana Rivera

==== Primary results ====
Republican primary results
Party	Candidate	Votes	%
Republican	Jennifer Zinone	3,113	100.0
Total votes		3,113	100.0

=== General election ===
==== Predictions ====
Source	Ranking	As of
The Cook Political Report	Safe D	July 2, 2020
Inside Elections	Safe D	June 2, 2020
Sabato's Crystal Ball	Safe D	July 2, 2020
Politico	Safe D	April 19, 2020
Daily Kos	Safe D	June 3, 2020
RCP	Safe D	June 9, 2020
Niskanen	Safe D	June 7, 2020

==== Results ====
New Jersey's 10th congressional district, 2020
Party	Candidate	Votes	%
Democratic	Donald Payne Jr. (incumbent)	241,522	83.3
Republican	Jennifer Zinone	40,298	13.9
Independent	Akil Khalfani	3,537	1.2
Independent	Liah Fitchette	3,480	1.2
Libertarian	John Mirrione	1,172	0.4
Total votes		290,009	100.0
Democratic hold			

==== By county ====
County	Donald Payne Jr. Democratic		Jennifer Zinone Republican		Various candidates Other parties		Margin		Total votes cast
County	#	%	#	%	#	%	#	%	Total votes cast
Essex (part)	146,101	89.4%	13,000	8.0%	4,394	2.6%	133,101	81.4%	163,495
Hudson (part)	44,418	75.9%	11,785	20.1%	2,287	4.0%	32,633	55.8%	58,490
Union (part)	51,003	75.0%	15,513	22.8%	1,588	2.3%	35,490	52.2%	68,024
Totals	241,522	83.3%	40,298	13.9%	8,189	2.8%	201,224	69.4%	290,009

== District 11 ==
2020 New Jersey's 11th congressional district election
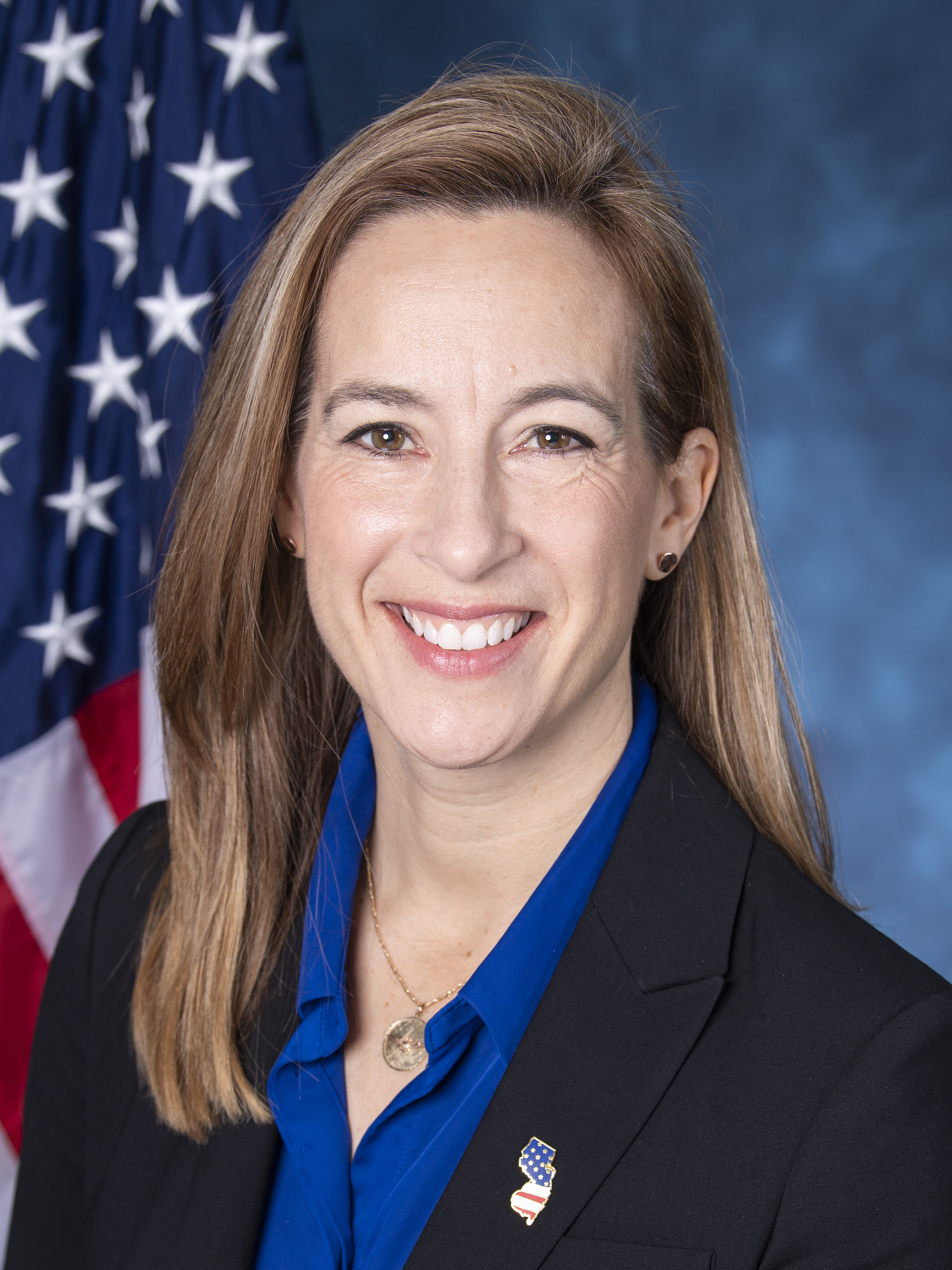

Nominee	Mikie Sherrill	Rosemary Becchi
Party	Democratic	Republican
Popular vote	235,163	206,013
Percentage	53.3%	46.7%
- Sherrill: 50–60% 60–70% 70–80% 80–90% Becchi: 50–60% 60–70%
U.S. Representative before election
Mikie Sherrill
Democratic
Elected U.S. Representative
Mikie Sherrill
Democratic

The 11th district includes parts of Morris, Essex, Passaic and Sussex counties. The incumbent was Democrat Mikie Sherrill, who flipped the district and was elected with 56.8% of the vote in 2018.

=== Democratic primary ===
==== Candidates ====
===== Declared =====
- Mikie Sherrill, incumbent U.S. representative

===== Withdrew =====
- Mark Washburne, professor

==== Endorsements ====
Mikie Sherrill

U.S. presidents

- Barack Obama, 44th president of the United States

Organizations

- Brady Campaign
- EMILY's List
- End Citizens United
- Giffords
- Human Rights Campaign
- Humane Society Legislative Fund
- League of Conservation Voters Action Fund
- NARAL Pro-Choice America
- National Organization for Women
- New Politics
- Planned Parenthood Action Fund
- Serve America PAC
- Sierra Club
- VoteVets

==== Primary results ====
Democratic primary results
Party	Candidate	Votes	%
Democratic	Mikie Sherrill (incumbent)	79,961	100.0
Total votes		79,961	100.0

=== Republican primary ===
==== Candidates ====
===== Declared =====
- Rosemary Becchi, tax attorney and nonprofit executive

===== Withdrawn =====
- Lawrence Casha, Kinnelon borough councilman
- Reinier Prijten, financial manager

===== Declined =====
- Patrick Alloco, former aide to former governor Thomas Kean
- Mary Pat Christie, former First Lady of New Jersey and former investment banker
- James Gannon, Morris County sheriff
- Curt Ritter, former mayor of Chatham Township and former press secretary for Rudy Giuliani

==== Endorsements ====
Rosemary Becchi

Organizations

- Maggie's List
- Susan B. Anthony List

==== Primary results ====
Republican primary results
Party	Candidate	Votes	%
Republican	Rosemary Becchi	46,774	100.0
Total votes		46,774	100.0

=== General election ===
Complete video of debate

==== Predictions ====
Source	Ranking	As of
The Cook Political Report	Safe D	August 14, 2020
Inside Elections	Safe D	June 2, 2020
Sabato's Crystal Ball	Safe D	July 2, 2020
Politico	Lean D	April 19, 2020
Daily Kos	Likely D	June 3, 2020
RCP	Likely D	June 9, 2020
Niskanen	Safe D	June 7, 2020

==== Results ====
New Jersey's 11th congressional district, 2020
Party	Candidate	Votes	%
Democratic	Mikie Sherrill (incumbent)	235,163	53.3
Republican	Rosemary Becchi	206,013	46.7
Total votes		441,176	100.0
Democratic hold			

==== By county ====
County	Mikie Sherrill Democratic		Rosemary Becchi Republican		Margin		Total votes cast
County	#	%	#	%	#	%	Total votes cast
Essex (part)	71,053	62.0%	43,603	38.0%	27,450	24.0%	114,656
Morris (part)	115,556	51.9%	107,237	48.1%	8,319	3.8%	222,793
Passaic (part)	35,716	48.1%	38,608	51.9%	−2,892	−3.8%	74,324
Sussex (part)	12,838	43.7%	16,565	56.3%	−3,727	−12.6%	29,403
Totals	235,163	53.3%	206,013	46.7%	29,150	6.6%	441,176

== District 12 ==
2020 New Jersey's 12th congressional district election
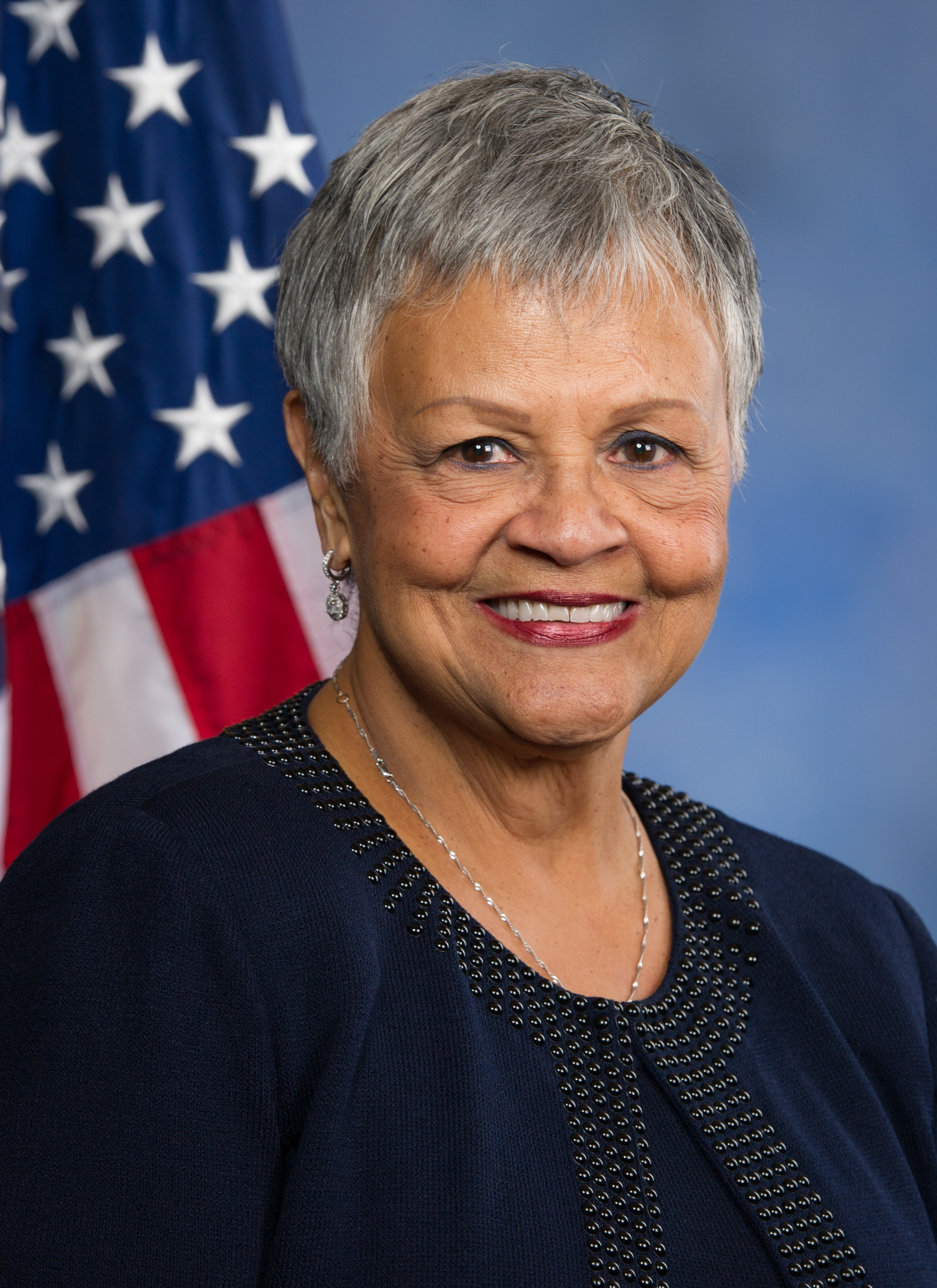

Nominee	Bonnie Watson Coleman	Mark Razzoli
Party	Democratic	Republican
Popular vote	230,883	114,591
Percentage	65.6%	32.6%
- Watson Coleman: 50–60% 60–70% 70–80% 80–90% Razzoli: 50–60%
U.S. Representative before election
Bonnie Watson Coleman
Democratic
Elected U.S. Representative
Bonnie Watson Coleman
Democratic

The 12th district is located in the Route 1 corridor, encompassing parts of Mercer, Middlesex, Somerset and Union counties. The incumbent was Democrat Bonnie Watson Coleman, who was reelected with 68.7% of the vote in 2018.

=== Democratic primary ===
==== Candidates ====
===== Declared =====
- Bonnie Watson Coleman, incumbent U.S. representative
- Lisa McCormick, activist and candidate for U.S. Senate in 2018

==== Endorsements ====
Bonnie Watson Coleman

Organizations

- National Organization for Women
- Sierra Club

==== Primary results ====
Democratic primary results
Party	Candidate	Votes	%
Democratic	Bonnie Watson Coleman (incumbent)	81,936	89.2
Democratic	Lisa McCormick	9,928	10.8
Total votes		91,864	100.0

=== Republican primary ===
==== Candidates ====
===== Declared =====
- Mark Razzoli, Old Bridge town councilman

==== Primary results ====
Republican primary results
Party	Candidate	Votes	%
Republican	Mark Razzoli	19,992	100.0
Total votes		19,992	100.0

=== General election ===
==== Predictions ====
Source	Ranking	As of
The Cook Political Report	Safe D	July 2, 2020
Inside Elections	Safe D	June 2, 2020
Sabato's Crystal Ball	Safe D	July 2, 2020
Politico	Safe D	April 19, 2020
Daily Kos	Safe D	June 3, 2020
RCP	Safe D	June 9, 2020
Niskanen	Safe D	June 7, 2020

==== Results ====
New Jersey's 12th congressional district, 2020
Party	Candidate	Votes	%
Democratic	Bonnie Watson Coleman (incumbent)	230,883	65.6
Republican	Mark Razzoli	114,591	32.6
Independent	Ed Forchion	4,512	1.3
Independent	Ken Cody	1,739	0.5
Total votes		351,725	100.0
Democratic hold			

==== By county ====
County	Bonnie Watson Coleman Democratic		Mark Razzoli Republican		Various candidates Other parties		Margin		Total votes cast
County	#	%	#	%	#	%	#	%	Total votes cast
Mercer (part)	85,492	74.1%	27,531	23.9%	2,385	2.0%	57,961	50.2%	115,408
Middlesex (part)	90,728	57.5%	65,119	41.2%	2,040	1.2%	25,609	16.3%	157,887
Somerset (part)	29,439	66.5%	13,486	30.5%	1,350	2.1%	15,593	35.0%	44,275
Union (part)	25,224	73.9%	8,455	24.8%	476	1.4%	16,769	49.1%	34,155
Totals	230,883	65.6%	114,591	32.6%	6,251	1.8%	116,292	33.0%	351,725

== See also ==
- 2020 New Jersey elections

== Notes ==
Partisan clients
