= Amani al-Khatahtbeh =

American author, activist and tech entrepreneur

Amani Al-Khatahtbeh
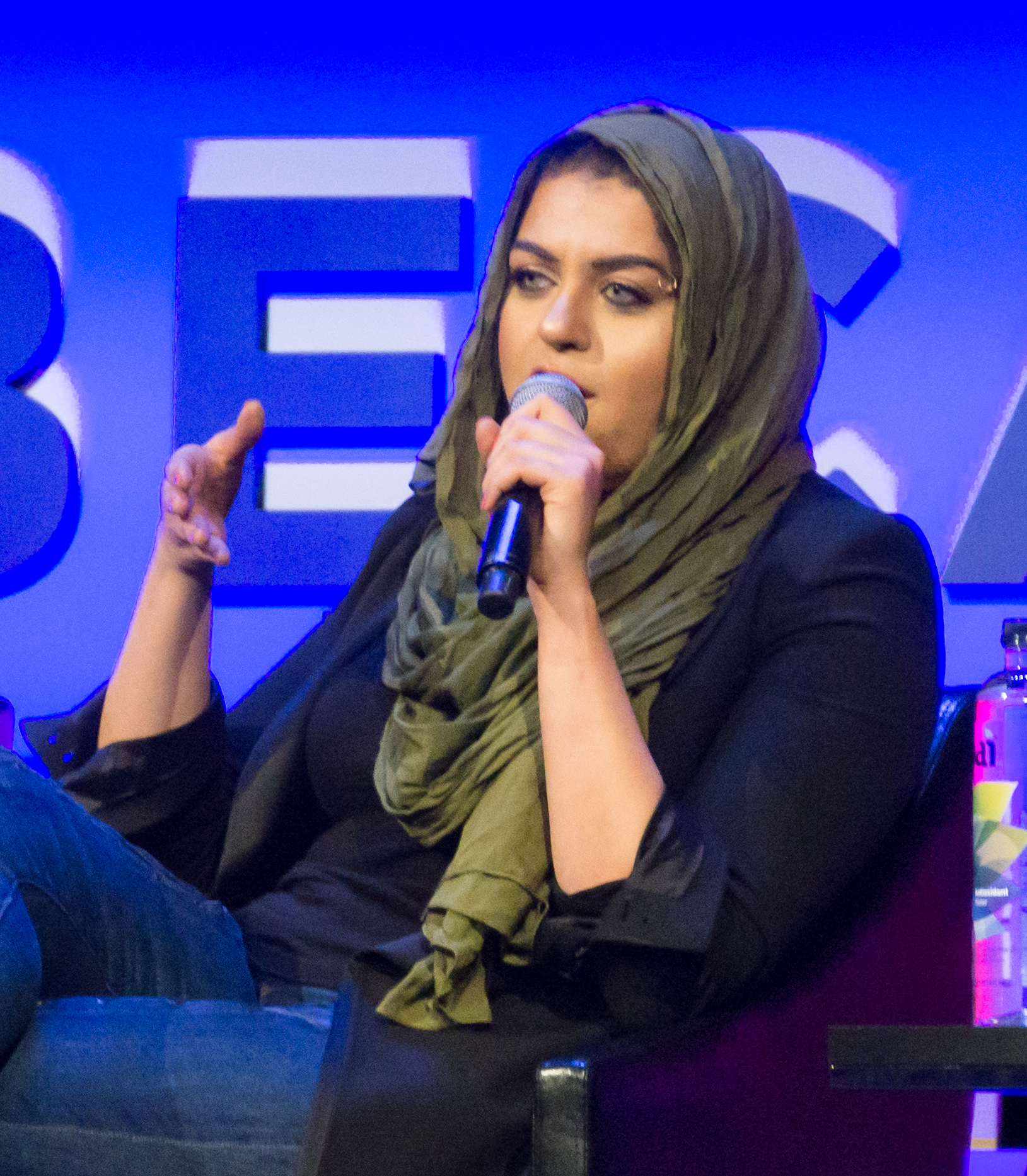
- At the Tribeca Film Festival in 2018
- Born: Amani Al-Khatahtbeh; 1991 or 1992 (age 34–35); New Jersey
- Education: Rutgers University
- Occupations: Author, politician, activist

Amani Al-Khatahtbeh (Arabic: أماني الخطاطبة) is an American author, activist and tech entrepreneur. She founded MuslimGirl.com, a blog for Muslim women. In 2016, she was included in Forbes 30 Under 30 in Media for her work with MuslimGirl. She was named one of the 25 most influential Muslim Americans by CNN. She unsuccessfully ran in the Democratic primary for U.S. Representative for New Jersey's 6th Congressional district in 2020.

== Early years ==
Al-Khatahtbeh was raised in New Jersey to Arab parents of Jordanian and Palestinian descent. When she was 13 years old, her family decided to move to Jordan due to concerns of increased violence against the Muslim community in the United States. After her mother fell ill, her family moved back to New Jersey to be closer to their relatives who still lived there. Back in New Jersey, she continued to feel closer to her Muslim identity and decided to wear the hijab as an act of resistance against Islamophobia. Due to the fact that there was no online community of young Muslim women, she decided to make her own and founded MuslimGirl.com in 2009 as a 17-year-old high school senior.

Following high school, she attended Rutgers University, graduating in 2014 with a political science degree. She then worked for a non-profit organization based in Washington, D.C. before moving to New York and briefly working for a major media organization.

== Career ==
=== MuslimGirl ===
In the beginning of 2015, MuslimGirl developed a volunteer staff and saw a large increase its readership. The site logged 1.7 million hits in 2018.

In 2016, she partnered with Teen Vogue for a web series that explored issues of concern to young Muslim women.

On March 27, 2017, MuslimGirl.com created Muslim Women's Day to increase representation of Muslim Women in media outlets.

=== Literary career ===
Al-Khatahtbeh's book, MuslimGirl: A Coming of Age, was released in October 2016. She was a panelist at the 2017 Brisbane Writers Festival in Brisbane, Queensland, Australia.

== Politics ==
On April 4, 2020, Al-Khatahtbeh announced her candidacy in the race to represent New Jersey's 6th congressional district, becoming the first Muslim woman in New Jersey to run for federal office. In the Democratic primary election, her opponents were the 16-term incumbent, Frank Pallone, and attorney Russ Cirincione.

Al-Khatahtbeh's campaign platform focused on progressive issues including Medicare for All, the Green New Deal, student debt cancellation, free public university tuition, criminal justice reform, and the federal minimum wage of $15.

== Controversies ==
In November 2020, she was briefly arrested and escorted out of an aircraft at Newark Liberty International Airport following a dispute with another passenger. She attributed the arrest to having been wrongfully singled out in the aftermath of the dispute.
