= 2003 New Jersey General Assembly election =

- November 7, 2003

All 80 seats to the General Assembly 41 seats needed for a majority
- Turnout: 34% (▼15pp)
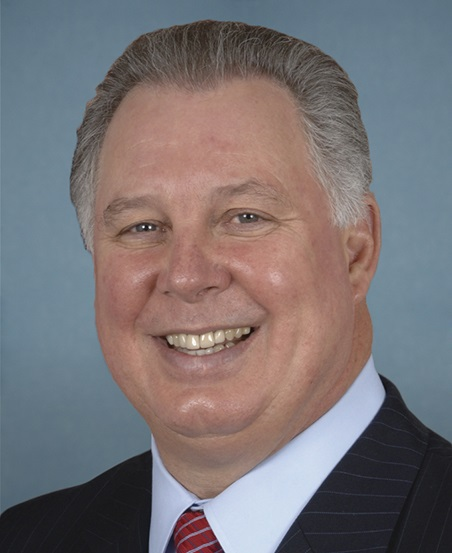

	Majority party	Minority party
Leader	Albio Sires	Paul DiGaetano (stepped down)
Party	Democratic	Republican
Leader since	January 8, 2002	January 9, 1996
Leader's seat	33rd (West New York)	36th (Franklin Lakes)
Last election	44	36
Seats before	42	37
Seats won	47	33
Seat change	▲5	▼4
- Results: Democratic gain Republican gain Democratic hold Republican hold
Speaker before election
Albio Sires
Democratic
Elected Speaker
Albio Sires
Democratic

The 2005 New Jersey General Assembly elections were held on November 7, 2003, for all 80 seats in the lower house of the New Jersey Legislature. The election was held during Democratic Governor Jim McGreevey's term. Democrats held a 44-36 majority in the lower house prior to the election. The members of the New Jersey Legislature are chosen from 40 electoral districts. Each district elects one State Senator and two State Assembly members. New Jersey uses coterminous legislative districts for both its State Senate and General Assembly.

The Democratic Party won a 47–33 majority. Democrats were able to flip one seat in the 4th district, one in the 19th (after the incumbent switched to the Republicans), and both seats in the 12th and 38th (including one from a Democrat-turned-Green). Republicans flipped one seat in the 14th.

== Incumbents not seeking re-election ==
=== Democratic ===
- Joseph Doria, District 31
- Elba Perez-Cinciarelli, District 31
- Rafael Fraguela, District 33
- Willis Edwards, District 34

=== Republican ===
- Nicholas Asselta, District 1
- Rose Marie Heck, District 38

== Predictions ==
Source	Ranking	As of
The Cook; Political Report	Lean D	October 4, 2002

== Summary of results by district ==
Legislative District	Position	Incumbent	Party	Elected Assembly Member	Party
1st	1	Nicholas Asselta	Republican	John C. Gibson	Republican
1st	2	Jeff Van Drew	Democrat	Jeff Van Drew	Democratic
2nd	1	Kirk W. Conover	Republican	Kirk W. Conover	Republican
2nd	2	Francis J. Blee	Republican	Francis J. Blee	Republican
3rd	1	John J. Burzichelli	Democrat	John J. Burzichelli	Democrat
3rd	2	Douglas H. Fisher	Democrat	Douglas H. Fisher	Democrat
4th	1	Robert J. Smith II	Democrat	Robert J. Smith II	Democrat
4th	2	Stephen Altamuro	Republican	David R. Mayer	Democrat
5th	1	Nilsa Cruz-Perez	Democrat	Nilsa Cruz-Perez	Democrat
5th	2	Joseph J. Roberts	Democrat	Joseph J. Roberts	Democrat
6th	1	Louis Greenwald	Democrat	Louis Greenwald	Democrat
6th	2	Mary Previte	Democrat	Mary Previte	Democrat
7th	1	Herb Conaway	Democrat	Herb Conaway	Democrat
7th	2	Jack Conners	Democrat	Jack Conners	Democrat
8th	1	Francis Bodine	Republican	Francis Bodine	Republican
8th	2	Larry Chatzidakis	Republican	Larry Chatzidakis	Republican
9th	1	Brian E. Rumpf	Republican	Brian E. Rumpf	Republican
9th	2	Christopher J. Connors	Republican	Christopher J. Connors	Republican
10th	1	James W. Holzapfel	Republican	James W. Holzapfel	Republican
10th	2	David W. Wolfe	Republican	David W. Wolfe	Republican
11th	1	Sean Kean	Republican	Sean Kean	Republican
11th	2	Steve Corodemus	Republican	Steve Corodemus	Republican
12th	1	Clare Farragher	Republican	Robert Lewis Morgan	Democratic
12th	2	Michael Arnone	Republican	Michael J. Panter	Democratic
13th	1	Samuel D. Thompson	Republican	Samuel D. Thompson	Republican
13th	2	Joseph Azzolina	Republican	Joseph Azzolina	Republican
14th	1	Gary Guear	Democrat	Bill Baroni	Republican
14th	2	Linda Greenstein	Democrat	Linda Greenstein	Democrat
15th	1	Bonnie Watson Coleman	Democrat	Bonnie Watson Coleman	Democrat
15th	2	Reed Gusciora	Democrat	Reed Gusciora	Democrat
16th	1	Peter Biondi	Republican	Peter Biondi	Republican
16th	2	Christopher Bateman	Republican	Christopher Bateman	Republican
17th	1	Upendra Chivukula	Democrat	Upendra Chivukula	Democrat
17th	2	Joseph V. Egan	Democrat	Joseph V. Egan	Democrat
18th	1	Peter Barnes	Democrat	Peter Barnes	Democrat
18th	2	Patrick J. Diegnan	Democrat	Patrick J. Diegnan	Democrat
19th	1	Arline Friscia	Republican	Joseph Vas	Democrat
19th	2	John Wisniewski	Democrat	John Wisniewski	Democrat
20th	1	Neil M. Cohen	Democrat	Neil M. Cohen	Democrat
20th	2	Joseph Cryan	Democrat	Joseph Cryan	Democrat
21st	1	Jon Bramnick	Republican	Jon Bramnick	Republican
21st	2	Eric Munoz	Republican	Eric Munoz	Republican
22nd	1	Linda Stender	Democrat	Linda Stender	Democrat
22nd	2	Jerry Green	Democrat	Jerry Green	Democrat
23rd	1	Michael J. Doherty	Republican	Michael J. Doherty	Republican
23rd	2	Connie Myers	Republican	Connie Myers	Republican
24th	1	Guy Gregg	Republican	Guy Gregg	Republican
24th	2	Alison Littell McHose	Republican	Alison Littell McHose	Republican
25th	1	Rick Merkt	Republican	Rick Merkt	Republican
25th	2	Michael Patrick Carroll	Republican	Michael Patrick Carroll	Republican
26th	1	Alex DeCroce	Republican	Alex DeCroce	Republican
26th	2	Joseph Pennacchio	Republican	Joseph Pennacchio	Republican
27th	1	John F. McKeon	Democrat	John F. McKeon	Democrat
27th	2	Mims Hackett	Democrat	Mims Hackett	Democrat
28th	1	Craig A. Stanley	Democrat	Craig A. Stanley	Democrat
28th	2	Donald Kofi Tucker	Democrat	Donald Tucker	Democrat
29th	1	William D. Payne	Democrat	William D. Payne	Democrat
29th	2	Wilfredo Caraballo	Democrat	Wilfredo Caraballo	Democrat
30th	1	Joseph Malone	Republican	Joseph Malone	Republican
30th	2	Ronald S. Dancer	Republican	Ronald S. Dancer	Republican
31st	1	Joseph Doria	Democrat	Louis Manzo	Democrat
31st	2	Elba Perez-Cinciarelli	Democrat	Charles T. Epps Jr.	Democrat
32nd	1	Joan M. Quigley	Democrat	Joan Quigley	Democrat
32nd	2	Anthony Impreveduto	Democrat	Anthony Impreveduto	Democrat
33rd	1	Albio Sires	Democrat	Albio Sires	Democrat
33rd	2	Rafael Fraguela	Democrat	Rafael Fraguela	Democrat
34th	1	Peter C. Eagler	Democrat	Peter C. Eagler	Democrat
34th	2	Willis Edwards	Democrat	Sheila Oliver	Democrat
35th	1	Nellie Pou	Democrat	Nellie Pou	Democrat
35th	2	Alfred Steele	Democrat	Alfred Steele	Democrat
36th	1	Paul DiGaetano	Republican	Paul DiGaetano	Republican
36th	2	Frederick Scalera	Democrat	Frederick Scalera	Democrat
37th	1	Gordon M. Johnson	Democrat	Gordon M. Johnson	Democrat
37th	2	Loretta Weinberg	Democrat	Loretta Weinberg	Democrat
38th	1	Matt Ahearn	Green	Joan Voss	Democrat
38th	2	Rose Marie Heck	Republican	Robert M. Gordon	Democrat
39th	1	Charlotte Vandervalk	Republican	Charlotte Vandervalk	Republican
39th	2	John E. Rooney	Republican	John E. Rooney	Republican
40th	1	Kevin J. O'Toole	Republican	Kevin J. O'Toole	Republican
40th	2	David C. Russo	Republican	David Russo	Republican

=== Close races ===
Districts where the difference of total votes between the top-two parties was under 10%:

1. District 1, 2.7%
2. District 3, 4.8%
3. District 4, 8.6% gain D
4. District 7, 4.6%
5. District 12, 6.4% gain
6. District 13, 1.7%
7. District 14, 4.8% gain R
8. District 36, 0.7%

== List of races ==
=== District 1 ===
New Jersey general election, 2003
Party	Candidate	Votes	%	±%
Democratic	Jeff Van Drew	25,080	26.5	▲0.2
Republican	John C. Gibson	24,187	25.6	▲0.3
Republican	Andrew J. McCrosson, Jr.	22,927	24.3	▼5.3
Democratic	Maria LaBoy	19,524	20.7	▲1.9
Green	Mary A. Snyder	1,193	1.3	N/A
Green	Carly R. Massey	835	0.9	N/A
Socialist	Costantino Rozzo	768	0.8	N/A
Total votes		94,514	100.0	

=== District 2 ===
New Jersey general election, 2003
Party	Candidate	Votes	%	±%
Republican	Frank Blee	24,787	31.0	▲3.3
Republican	Kirk Conover	23,259	29.1	▲1.0
Democratic	Stephen P. Swift	14,277	17.8	▼4.0
Democratic	Alisa Cooper	13,945	17.4	▼4.2
Green	Meredith Slotoroff	1,579	2.0	▲1.1
Green	Ray Higbee Jr	1,488	1.9	N/A
People's People	Joseph T. Hicks	700	0.9	N/A
Total votes		80,035	100.0	

=== District 3 ===
New Jersey general election, 2003
Party	Candidate	Votes	%	±%
Democratic	Douglas H. Fisher	27,178	25.4	▼2.7
Democratic	John J. Burzichelli	27,110	25.3	▼1.3
Republican	Susan Bestwick	25,056	23.4	▲0.6
Republican	Douglas Sorantino	24,069	22.5	0.0
Green	Peggy Murphy	1,951	1.8	N/A
Green	Charles Woodrow	1,627	1.5	N/A
Total votes		106,991	100.0	

=== District 4 ===
New Jersey general election, 2003
Party	Candidate	Votes	%	±%
Democratic	Robert Smith	22,256	27.3	▲1.4
Democratic	David R. Mayer	21,965	27.0	▲2.2
Republican	Patrick M. Dougherty	18,641	22.9	▼5.1
Republican	Stephen Altamuro	18,636	22.9	▲1.6
Total votes		81,498	100.0	

=== District 5 ===
New Jersey general election, 2003
Party	Candidate	Votes	%	±%
Democratic	Joe Roberts	21,608	32.5	▼10.5
Democratic	Nilsa I. Cruz-Perez	20,260	30.5	▼9.6
Republican	Jeffrey R. Kugler	12,467	18.7	▲1.8
Republican	Eddie Torres	12,165	18.3	N/A
Total votes		66,500	100.0	

=== District 6 ===
New Jersey general election, 2003
Party	Candidate	Votes	%	±%
Democratic	Louis D. Greenwald	27,228	28.8	▼3.9
Democratic	Mary T. Previte	26,798	28.4	▼3.9
Republican	Mark Otto	18,421	19.5	▲1.9
Republican	Joann R. Gurenlian	18,342	19.4	▲2.0
Green	Kevin Madden	1,951	2.1	N/A
Green	Martin Nolan	1,778	1.9	N/A
Total votes		94,518	100.0	

=== District 7 ===
New Jersey general election, 2003
Party	Candidate	Votes	%	±%
Democratic	Herb Conaway	22,161	26.2	▼3.3
Democratic	Jack Conners	22,059	26.1	▼3.6
Republican	Jean Stanfield	20,600	24.4	▲4.1
Republican	Mike Savala	19,727	23.3	▲3.6
Total votes		84,547	100.0	

=== District 8 ===
New Jersey general election, 2003
Party	Candidate	Votes	%	±%
Republican	Francis L. Bodine	27,513	33.6	▲3.2
Republican	Larry Chatzidakis	26,785	32.7	▲3.1
Democratic	Donald Hartman	14,191	17.3	▼3.1
Democratic	Kenneth Solarz	13,316	16.3	▼3.3
Total votes		81,805	100.0	

=== District 9 ===
New Jersey general election, 2003
Party	Candidate	Votes	%	±%
Republican	Christopher J. Connors	35,580	32.7	▲2.6
Republican	Brian E. Rumpf	31,307	28.7	▼0.9
Democratic	Dolores J. Coulter	21,282	19.5	▼1.3
Democratic	Peter A. Terranova	20,763	19.1	▼0.4
Total votes		108,932	100.0	

=== District 10 ===
New Jersey general election, 2003
Party	Candidate	Votes	%	±%
Republican	David W. Wolfe	28,812	31.9	▲2.7
Republican	Jim Holzapfel	27,509	30.5	▲1.5
Democratic	Desmond Abazia	15,773	17.5	▼3.6
Democratic	Mark Troncone	15,418	17.1	▼3.7
Green	Elizabeth Arnone	2,765	3.1	N/A
Total votes		90,277	100.0	

=== District 11 ===
New Jersey general election, 2003
Party	Candidate	Votes	%	±%
Republican	Steve Corodemus	23,599	30.3	▲1.3
Republican	Sean Kean	22,480	28.9	▲2.0
Democratic	Charles "Chuck" Davis	13,791	17.7	▼4.2
Democratic	John Loffredo	13,205	17.0	▼3.7
Green	Lynn Surgalla	2,383	3.1	N/A
Green	Thomas Auletta	2,366	3.0	N/A
Total votes		77,824	100.0	

=== District 12 ===
New Jersey general election, 2003
Party	Candidate	Votes	%	±%
Democratic	Michael Panter	23,613	26.8	▲3.8
Democratic	Robert Morgan	23,240	26.4	▲3.6
Republican	Michael J. Arnone	21,098	24.0	▼3.3
Republican	Clare M. Farragher	20,140	22.9	▼3.3
Total votes		88,091	100.0	

=== District 13 ===
New Jersey general election, 2003
Party	Candidate	Votes	%	±%
Republican	Samuel D. Thompson	20,378	24.4	▼3.3
Republican	Joe Azzolina	20,125	24.1	▼4.8
Democratic	Leonard Inzerillo	19,881	23.8	▲1.7
Democratic	Thomas Perry	19,178	23.0	▲2.7
Green	Mike W. Hall	2,002	2.4	N/A
Green	Jaime Donnelly	1,896	2.3	N/A
Total votes		83,460	100.0	

=== District 14 ===
New Jersey general election, 2003
Party	Candidate	Votes	%	±%
Republican	Bill Baroni	27,181	27.9	▲4.7
Democratic	Linda R. Greenstein	24,752	25.5	▼2.0
Republican	Sidna B. Mitchell	23,872	24.5	▲1.5
Democratic	Gary L. Guear Sr	21,448	22.1	▼4.2
Total votes		97,253	100.0	

=== District 15 ===
New Jersey general election, 2003
Party	Candidate	Votes	%	±%
Democratic	Bonnie Watson Coleman	21,550	31.1	▼2.9
Democratic	Reed Gusciora	20,639	29.8	▼3.8
Republican	Brian McKeon	12,239	17.7	▲1.5
Republican	Donald Addison	11,914	17.2	▲1.7
Green	Jill Penn	1,504	2.2	N/A
Green	Russell Cullen	1,358	2.0	N/A
Total votes		69,204	100.0	

=== District 16 ===
New Jersey general election, 2003
Party	Candidate	Votes	%	±%
Republican	Pete Biondi	26,211	39.0	▲6.4
Republican	Christopher “Kip” Bateman	25,849	38.5	▲4.7
Democratic	Robert Mack	11,938	17.8	▲0.5
Green	Jane Hunter	3,219	4.8	N/A
Total votes		67,217	100.0	

=== District 17 ===
New Jersey general election, 2003
Party	Candidate	Votes	%	±%
Democratic	Joseph V. Egan	16,143	28.8	▼5.0
Democratic	Upendra Chivukula	15,956	28.5	▼3.4
Republican	Catherine J. Barrier	10,988	19.6	▲2.4
Republican	Scott Johnkins	10,206	18.2	▲1.1
Green	Josephine M. Giaimo	1,388	2.5	N/A
Green	David Hochfelder	1,298	2.3	N/A
Total votes		55,979	100.0	

=== District 18 ===
New Jersey general election, 2003
Party	Candidate	Votes	%	±%
Democratic	Peter J. Barnes Jr	18,032	29.6	▼3.4
Democratic	Patrick J. Diegnan Jr	16,255	26.7	▼4.4
Republican	Robert D. Thuring	13,994	23.0	▲4.7
Republican	Jasal Amin	12,636	20.7	▲3.1
Total votes		60,917	100.0	

=== District 19 ===
New Jersey general election, 2003
Party	Candidate	Votes	%	±%
Democratic	John S. Wisniewski	21,613	32.3	▼5.1
Democratic	Joseph Vas	18,101	27.0	▼8.7
Republican	Arline M. Friscia	14,904	22.3	▲8.1 (▼13.4)
Republican	Jeffrey A. Pino	12,312	18.4	▲5.8
Total votes		66,930	100.0	

=== District 20 ===
New Jersey general election, 2003
Party	Candidate	Votes	%	±%
Democratic	Neil M. Cohen	12,035	31.4	▼9.9
Democratic	Joseph Cryan	12,016	31.3	▼9.5
Republican	A. Tony Monteiro	7,515	19.6	N/A
Republican	Aristo Carranza	6,821	17.8	N/A
Total votes		38,387	100.0	

=== District 21 ===
New Jersey general election, 2003
Party	Candidate	Votes	%	±%
Republican	Eric Munoz	27,626	29.9	▲1.5
Republican	Jon Bramnick	26,714	28.9	▼2.9
Democratic	Ellen Steinberg	19,602	21.2	▲0.7
Democratic	Norman W. Albert	16,087	17.4	▼1.9
Green	George DeCarlo	1,045	1.1	N/A
Green	Ryan Reyes	987	1.1	N/A
Unemployed	Joshua Jacobs	464	0.5	N/A
Total votes		92,525	100.0	

=== District 22 ===
New Jersey general election, 2003
Party	Candidate	Votes	%	±%
Democratic	Linda Stender	17,236	28.9	▼1.6
Democratic	Jerry Green	16,322	27.3	▼2.3
Republican	Kevin Retcho	12,126	20.3	▼0.2
Republican	George B. Gore	11,962	20.0	▲0.6
Green	Rosalie Donatelli	1,183	2.0	N/A
Green	Harold Relkin	885	1.5	N/A
Total votes		59,714	100.0	

=== District 23 ===
New Jersey general election, 2003
Party	Candidate	Votes	%	±%
Republican	Connie Myers	26,122	30.9	▼1.5
Republican	Michael J. Doherty	25,554	30.3	▲1.1
Democratic	Brian D. Smith	17,100	20.3	▲3.8
Democratic	Cynthia L. Ege	15,658	18.5	▲2.4
Total votes		84,434	100.0	

=== District 24 ===
New Jersey general election, 2003
Party	Candidate	Votes	%	±%
Republican	Guy R. Gregg	24,472	41.3	▲7.1
Republican	Alison Littell McHose	23,103	39.0	▲2.7
Democratic	Thomas B. Boyle	11,658	19.7	▲4.8
Total votes		59,233	100.0	

=== District 25 ===
New Jersey general election, 2003
Party	Candidate	Votes	%	±%
Republican	Michael P. Carroll	23,841	37.6	▲7.6
Republican	Rick Merkt	23,525	37.1	▲7.1
Democratic	Thomas A. Zelante	16,094	25.4	▲4.6
Total votes		63,460	100.0	

=== District 26 ===
New Jersey general election, 2003
Party	Candidate	Votes	%	±%
Republican	Alex DeCroce	20,882	32.7	▼1.5
Republican	Joseph Pennacchio	20,609	32.2	▼0.2
Democratic	Laurie Fierro	11,467	17.9	▲1.0
Democratic	Patrick J. Caserta	10,972	17.2	▲0.8
Total votes		63,930	100.0	

=== District 27 ===
New Jersey general election, 2003
Party	Candidate	Votes	%	±%
Democratic	John F. McKeon	16,621	32.5	▲1.1
Democratic	Mims Hackett Jr	15,751	30.8	▲1.9
Republican	Tod Theise	9,207	18.0	▼1.1
Republican	Patience Elliot	8,864	17.4	▼1.2
Libertarian	Jany Sabins	631	1.2	N/A
Total votes		51,074	100.0	

=== District 28 ===
New Jersey general election, 2003
Party	Candidate	Votes	%	±%
Democratic	Donald Tucker	9,730	37.4	▲0.4
Democratic	Craig A. Stanley	9,415	36.2	▼0.4
Republican	Barbara Dennis	3,480	13.4	▲0.7
Republican	Nicholas F. DeAngelis	3,385	13.0	▲1.0
Total votes		26,010	100.0	

=== District 29 ===
New Jersey general election, 2003
Party	Candidate	Votes	%	±%
Democratic	William D. Payne	8,621	42.8	▼1.8
Democratic	Wilfredo Caraballo	8,179	40.6	▼2.8
Republican	Miguel A. Negron	1,700	8.4	▲2.7
Republican	Elaine L. Guarino	1,657	8.2	▲1.9
Total votes		20,157	100.0	

=== District 30 ===
New Jersey general election, 2003
Party	Candidate	Votes	%	±%
Republican	Joseph R. Malone	25,497	33.0	▲2.4
Republican	Ronald S. Dancer	24,355	31.5	▲1.9
Democratic	Joseph D. Grisanti	14,347	18.6	▼2.1
Democratic	Mitchel Dolobowsky	13,031	16.9	▼2.2
Total votes		77,230	100.0	

=== District 31 ===
New Jersey general election, 2003
Party	Candidate	Votes	%	±%
Democratic	Louis Manzo	15,588	40.1	▲2.5
Democratic	Anthony Chiappone	15,268	39.3	▲3.6
Republican	Donna Marie James	3,175	8.2	▼4.6
Republican	Stephen Schulz	2,920	7.5	▼4.9
Green	Pamela Olsen	1,023	2.6	N/A
Green	Jonathan J. Oriole	911	2.3	N/A
Total votes		38,885	100.0	

=== District 32 ===
New Jersey general election, 2003
Party	Candidate	Votes	%	±%
Democratic	Anthony Impreveduto	17,113	38.7	▲2.0
Democratic	Joan Quigley	17,064	38.6	▲2.2
Republican	Delia Kelly	4,157	9.4	▼4.1
Republican	Anna Crespo-Hernandez	4,136	9.4	▼4.0
Time For Change	Eric Dixon	883	2.0	N/A
Time For Change	Eugene McCrohan	828	1.9	N/A
Total votes		44,181	100.0	

=== District 33 ===
New Jersey general election, 2003
Party	Candidate	Votes	%	±%
Democratic	Brian P. Stack	21,457	41.9	▲4.3
Democratic	Albio Sires	20,580	40.2	▲2.4
Republican	Jose C. Munoz	4,159	8.1	▼4.3
Republican	Elise DiNardo	4,141	8.1	▼4.1
Green	Maria M. Rios	866	1.7	N/A
Total votes		51,203	100.0	

=== District 34 ===
New Jersey general election, 2003
Party	Candidate	Votes	%	±%
Democratic	Peter C. Eagler	17,637	33.2	▼1.2
Democratic	Sheila Y. Oliver	16,504	31.0	▼1.1
Republican	Kenneth Kurson	9,337	17.6	▼0.1
Republican	Keith E. Krebs	7,949	15.0	▼0.8
Green	Timothy A. Gaylord Jr	866	1.6	N/A
Green	Thomas Robert Gregg	864	1.6	N/A
Total votes		53,157	100.0	

=== District 35 ===
New Jersey general election, 2003
Party	Candidate	Votes	%	±%
Democratic	Alfred Steele	14,658	32.8	▼18.4
Democratic	Nellie Pou	14,299	31.9	▼16.9
Republican	Kenneth N. Del Vecchio Jr	8,120	18.1	N/A
Republican	Thomas F.X. Magura	7,680	17.2	N/A
Total votes		44,757	100.0	

=== District 36 ===
New Jersey general election, 2003
Party	Candidate	Votes	%	±%
Republican	Paul DiGaetano	17,144	26.1	▼0.7
Democratic	Frederick Scalera	16,244	24.8	0.0
Democratic	Imre Karaszegi Jr	15,386	23.4	0.0
Republican	Richard J. DiLascio	14,942	22.8	▼0.4
Real Pro-Choice	Geovanni Regalado	581	0.9	N/A
Tax the Rich	Crystal Delarosa	491	0.7	N/A
Tax the Rich	Rafael Sanchez	474	0.7	▲0.2
Real Pro-Choice	John Zazanis	368	0.6	0.0
Total votes		65,630	100.0	

=== District 37 ===
New Jersey general election, 2003
Party	Candidate	Votes	%	±%
Democratic	Loretta Weinberg	23,516	32.9	▼1.5
Democratic	Gordon M. Johnson	22,492	31.5	▼1.1
Republican	John M. Long	11,778	16.5	▼0.2
Republican	Sanford Steinfeld	11,690	16.3	▲0.1
Green	Patricia Alessandrini	1,063	1.5	N/A
Green	Ruth Bauer Neustadter	974	1.4	N/A
Total votes		71,513	100.0	

=== District 38 ===
New Jersey general election, 2003
Party	Candidate	Votes	%	±%
Democratic	Robert M. Gordon	21,857	26.9	▲1.7
Democratic	Joan Voss	20,580	25.4	▲0.5
Republican	Louis A. Tedesco Jr	17,398	21.4	▼3.9
Republican	Ed Trawinski	16,983	20.9	▼3.7
Green	Matt Ahearn	4,357	5.4	▼19.8
Total votes		81,175	100.0	

=== District 39 ===
New Jersey general election, 2003
Party	Candidate	Votes	%	±%
Republican	Charlotte Vandervalk	31,701	33.0	▲1.6
Republican	John E. Rooney	31,173	32.4	▲2.0
Democratic	John Dean DeRienzo	16,665	17.3	▼2.7
Democratic	Philip Peredo	16,652	17.3	▼0.9
Total votes		96,191	100.0	

=== District 40 ===
New Jersey general election, 2003
Party	Candidate	Votes	%	±%
Republican	David C. Russo	23,965	32.3	▲1.6
Republican	Kevin J. O'Toole	23,865	32.1	▲1.9
Democratic	Michael Bradley	12,624	17.0	▼2.9
Democratic	Jane Bidwell Gaunt	12,535	16.9	▼2.3
Green	Philip A. Passantino	1,256	1.7	N/A
Total votes		74,245	100.0	

== See also ==
- 2003 New Jersey Senate election
