= Charles Mays =

American politician

Charles May Sr.

Member of the New Jersey General Assembly from the 31st District
- In office January 10, 1978 – January 12, 1982 Serving with Patrick C. Pasculli (1978-80); Joseph Doria (1980-82)
- Preceded by: Stephen R. Kopycinski; Bill Perkins
- Succeeded by: Joseph Charles

Personal details
- Born: February 3, 1941 Jersey City, New Jersey
- Died: April 11, 2005 (aged 64)
- Party: Democratic
- Education: University of Maryland Eastern Shore

Charles Mays Sr. (February 3, 1941 – April 11, 2005) was an American Olympic athlete and Democratic Party politician who represented the 31st Legislative District in the New Jersey General Assembly. He was an eleven-time Amateur Athletic Union (AAU) All-American, nine-time AAU champion in the long jump and six-time champion in the 440-yard dash. Mays was AAU Track and Field Athlete of the Year on three occasions, and a two-time NCAA champion in the long jump and the mile relay. He competed in the long jump at the 1968 Summer Olympics in Mexico City.

Mays grew up in Jersey City, New Jersey and competed in track while at Lincoln High School. He served six years on the city council in Jersey City and two terms in the New Jersey General Assembly.

Mays founded the Black Athletes Hall of Fame in 1973 and later served as its executive director.

Mays was inducted to the University of Maryland Eastern Shore Hawks Hall of Fame in 1982. In 2007, Hudson County, New Jersey named the running track at Lincoln Park in his honor.
