= 2024 New Jersey's 10th congressional district special election =

- September 18, 2024

New Jersey's 10th congressional district
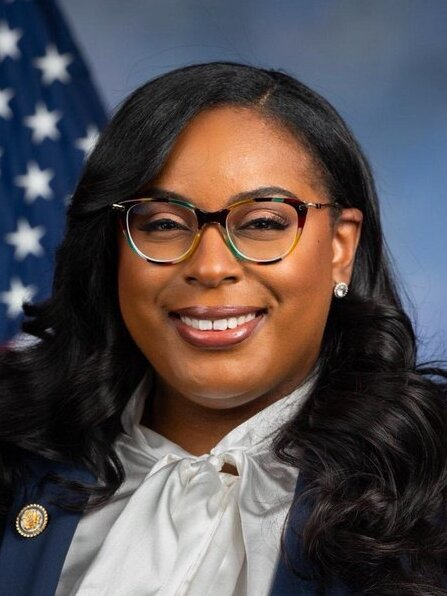

Nominee	LaMonica McIver	Carmen Bucco
Party	Democratic	Republican
Popular vote	27,402	5,258
Percentage	81.4%	15.6%
- County results McIver: 70–80% 80–90%
U.S. Representative before election
Donald Payne Jr.
Democratic
Elected U.S. Representative
LaMonica McIver
Democratic

The 2024 New Jersey's 10th congressional district special election was held on September 18, 2024, to fill the vacant seat in New Jersey's 10th congressional district. The winner will serve in the United States House of Representatives for the remainder of the 118th United States Congress. The seat became vacant on April 24, 2024, when Donald Payne Jr. died following a heart attack related to complications from diabetes. The urban district is considered a safely Democratic seat; Payne Jr. had won all 7 bids for this seat with at least 77.6% of the vote.

On May 3, Governor Phil Murphy scheduled the special election for September 18, with primaries being held on July 16. This was the first non-November special election for a vacant House seat in New Jersey since 1950 which Republican William Widnall won after incumbent Representative J. Parnell Thomas was convicted on corruption charges. This was the first time since 1989 where no one from the Payne family represented this district.

== Democratic primary ==
=== Candidates ===
==== Nominee ====
- LaMonica McIver, president of the Newark Municipal Council (2022–present) from the Central Ward (2018–present)

==== Eliminated in primary ====
- Derek Armstead, mayor of Linden (2014–present) and Linden Democratic municipal chair
- Brittany Claybrooks, former East Orange city councilor (2019–2023)
- John Flora, teacher and candidate for this district in 2020
- Darryl Godfrey, COO of the New Jersey Redevelopment Authority
- Alberta Gordon, data engineering manager
- Eugene Mazo, Rutgers Law School professor and candidate for this district in 2020
- Shana Melius, former constituent services staffer to Donald Payne Jr.
- Sheila Montague, teacher and candidate for mayor of Newark in 2022
- Debra Salters, community activist and independent candidate for New Jersey's 29th assembly district in 2021
- Jerry Walker, Hudson County commissioner from the 3rd district (2018–present) and candidate for mayor of Jersey City in 2013

==== Declined ====
- Ras Baraka, mayor of Newark (2014–present) (running for governor in 2025, endorsed McIver)
- Ronald Slaughter, pastor (endorsed McIver)

=== Endorsements ===
Derek Armstead

State legislators

- Reginald Atkins, state assemblymember from the 20th district (2022–present) and Roselle Democratic municipal chair
- Nicholas Scutari, president of the New Jersey Senate (2022–present) from the 22nd district (2004–present) and chair of the Union County Democratic Party

Party officials

- Anthony Salters, Hillside Democratic municipal chair
LaMonica McIver

U.S. senators

- Cory Booker, U.S. senator from New Jersey (2013–present)

U.S. representatives

- Pramila Jayapal, U.S. representative from Washington's 7th congressional district (2017–present)
- Mark Pocan, U.S. representative from Wisconsin's 2nd congressional district (2013–present)
- Jamie Raskin, U.S. representative from Maryland's 8th congressional district (2017–present)

Statewide officials

- Phil Murphy, Governor of New Jersey (2018–present)

State legislators

- Renee Burgess, state senator from the 28th district (2022–present)
- Joseph Cryan, state senator from the 20th district (2018–present) and Union Township Democratic municipal chair
- Eliana Pintor Marin, state assemblywoman from the 29th district (2013–present)
- William D. Payne, former state assemblyman from the 29th district (1998–2008)
- Teresa Ruiz, Majority Leader of the New Jersey Senate (2022–present) from the 29th district (2008–present)
- Shanique Speight, state assemblywoman from the 29th district (2018–present)

County officials

- Joseph DiVincenzo Jr., Essex County Executive (2003–present)
- 9 Essex County commissioners

Local officials

- Ras Baraka, mayor of Newark (2014–present)
- 6 other mayors

Party officials

- LeRoy Jones, chair of the New Jersey Democratic Party (2021–present) and the Essex County Democratic Party
- Democratic municipal chairs in Cranford, Garwood, Irvington, Kenilworth, and Roselle Park

Political parties

- Essex County Democratic Party
- Union County Democratic Party

Labor unions

- SEIU New Jersey (Note: New Jersey State Council and 32BJ)
Jerry Walker

State legislators

- Barbara McCann Stamato, state assemblywoman from the 31st district (2024–present)
- William Sampson, state assemblyman from the 31st district (2022–present)

County officials

- Craig Guy, Hudson County Executive (2024–present) and chair of the Hudson County Democratic Party
Declined to endorse

Local officials

- Steven Fulop, mayor of Jersey City (2013–present)

Political parties

- Hudson County Democratic Party

=== Fundraising ===
Campaign finance reports as of June 26, 2024
Candidate	Raised	Spent	Cash on hand
Derek Armstead (D)	$51,325 (Note: $5,000 of this total was self-funded by Armstead)	$18,875	$32,449
Brittany Claybrooks (D)	$9,036	$6,637	$2,398
Darryl Godfrey (D)	$67,865 (Note: $2,300 of this total was self-funded by Godfrey)	$59,667	$8,197
LaMonica McIver (D)	$90,833 (Note: $1,025 of this total was self-funded by McIver)	$33,985	$56,847
Shana Melius (D)	$13,126 (Note: $10,000 of this total was self-funded by Melius)	$9,755	$4,871
Source: Federal Election Commission

=== Results ===
Results by county: McIver: 40–50%; 50–60%; Walker: 40–50%

Democratic primary results
Party	Candidate	Votes	%
Democratic	LaMonica McIver	12,507	47.4
Democratic	Derek Armstead	3,596	13.6
Democratic	Jerry Walker	2,568	9.7
Democratic	Darryl Godfrey	1,815	6.9
Democratic	Brittany Claybrooks	1,377	5.2
Democratic	Shana Melius	1,196	4.5
Democratic	Sheila Montague	966	3.7
Democratic	Alberta Gordon	756	2.9
Democratic	John Flora	684	2.6
Democratic	Eugene Mazo	586	2.2
Democratic	Debra Salters	316	1.2
Total votes		26,367	100.0

== Republican primary ==
=== Candidates ===
==== Nominee ====
- Carmen Bucco, businessman, perennial candidate, and nominee for this seat in the regular 2024 election

=== Endorsements ===
Carmen Bucco

Political parties

- Essex County Republican Party
- Hudson County Republican Party
- Union County Republican Party

=== Fundraising ===
Campaign finance reports as of June 30, 2024
Candidate	Raised	Spent	Cash on hand
Carmen Bucco (R)	$16,790	$7,231	$9,559
Source: Federal Election Commission

=== Results ===
Republican primary results
Party	Candidate	Votes	%
Republican	Carmen Bucco	2,015	100.0
Total votes		2,015	100.0

== Independents ==
=== Declared ===
- Russell Jenkins (One For All... (Note: Not an actual political party. In New Jersey, independent candidates are allowed to choose a ballot label)), financial advisor
- Rayfield Morton (Creating Real Progress), former Orange city councilor

== General election ==
=== Results ===
2024 New Jersey's 10th congressional district special election
Party	Candidate	Votes	%	±%
Democratic	LaMonica McIver	27,402	81.39%	+3.75%
Republican	Carmen Bucco	5,258	15.62%	−6.42%
One For All...	Russell Jenkins	530	1.57%	N/A
Creating Real Progress	Rayfield Morton	476	1.41%	N/A
Total votes		33,666	100.00%	
Democratic hold				

==== By county ====
County	LaMonica McIver Democratic		Carmen Bucco Republican		Various candidates Other parties		Margin		Total votes cast
County	#	%	#	%	#	%	#	%	Total votes cast
Essex (part)	16,649	86.4%	1,950	10.1%	661	3.5%	14,699	76.3%	19,260
Hudson (part)	3,349	83.5%	516	12.9%	147	3.6%	2,833	70.6%	4,012
Union (part)	7,404	71.2%	2,792	26.7%	198	2.1%	4,612	44.5%	10,394
Totals	27,402	81.39%	5,258	15.62%	1,006	2.98%	22,144	65.77%	33,666
