= L. Harvey Smith =

American politician

Leonard Harvey Smith

Member of the New Jersey General Assembly from the 31st district
- In office January 8, 2008 – January 12, 2010 Serving with Anthony Chiappone
- Preceded by: Louis Manzo; Charles T. Epps Jr.
- Succeeded by: Charles Mainor

Acting Mayor of Jersey City
- In office May 25, 2004 – November 11, 2004
- Preceded by: Glenn Cunningham
- Succeeded by: Jerramiah T. Healy

Member of the New Jersey Senate from the 31st district
- In office November 24, 2003 – January 13, 2004
- Preceded by: Joseph Doria
- Succeeded by: Glenn Cunningham

Personal details
- Born: December 19, 1948 (age 77)
- Party: Democratic
- Profession: Teacher

Leonard Harvey Smith (born December 19, 1948) is an American Democratic Party politician who served in the General Assembly from January 8, 2008 to January 10, 2010, where he represented the 31st legislative district. He is the former Acting Mayor of Jersey City, New Jersey and previously served in the New Jersey Senate. He did not seek re-election in 2009.

== Biography ==
Smith received a B.S. from Long Island University in Health / Physical Education and an M.A. from New Jersey City University in Psychology / Counseling.

Smith served in the Assembly on the Higher Education Committee and the Transportation, Public Works and Independent Authorities Committee.

A three-term Jersey City councilman who spent four years as City Council President, Smith served as Acting Mayor following the death of Mayor Glenn Cunningham in May 2004 until the certification of the results of a special election in November 2004. Smith ran in the special election to fill the remainder of Cunningham's term which expired in July 2005, but lost to Judge Jerramiah T. Healy.

In 2003, Smith ran against Cunningham for a seat in the New Jersey Senate representing parts of Jersey City and all of Bayonne. While endorsed by the Hudson County Democratic Organization, Smith lost in the primary to Cunningham. In October 2003, when State Sen. Joseph Charles resigned early to become a state judge, Smith was selected by Democratic Party leaders to fill the remainder of Charles' Senate term until January 2004. He was sworn into the Senate seat in November 2003.

Smith, a former teacher, was appointed as an Undersheriff of Hudson County after he left the State Senate. He took a leave as undersheriff to serve as acting mayor and then returned to the post. He did not seek reelection to the City Council in 2005.

In March 2007, Smith announced his campaign in the Democratic Primary for the State Assembly on a ticket headed by former Jersey City First Lady Sandra Bolden Cunningham. Smith won a spot on the ballot in the June 2007 primary and won an uncontested election in November 2007. Smith served one term in the Assembly as a representative of the 31st legislative district.

On June 8, 2009, Smith introduced a bill into the New Jersey State Assembly that would ban the use of GPS systems in cars.

== Operation Bid Rig ==
Smith was one of 44 individuals arrested on July 23, 2009, as part of Operation Bid Rig, a joint operation of the FBI, IRS, and the U.S. Attorney's Office for the District of New Jersey into political corruption and money laundering. Smith was charged with accepting $15,000 in bribes in exchange for obtaining approval of building plans.

Despite call for Smith's resignation from Governor Jon Corzine and others, Smith has said that he would remain in office. In a letter sent to Assembly Speaker Joseph J. Roberts on August 6, 2009, Smith stated, "I believe that the resignation of my position as assemblyman is inconsistent with the presumption of innocence." Roberts, however, has said that he would suspend Smith's pay and benefits.

On February 9, 2010, Smith was indicted for receiving $15,000 in bribes from a government informant. He pleaded not guilty and planned to use an entrapment defense for the federal trial, scheduled to begin on November 29, 2010. After a three-week trial, Smith was acquitted of all charges on December 16, 2010.

New Jersey Senate
Preceded by Joseph Charles	New Jersey State Senator; 31st Legislative District; November 2003 – January 2004	Succeeded by Glenn Cunningham
Political offices
Preceded by Glenn Cunningham	Mayor of Jersey City; May– November 2004 as Acting Mayor	Succeeded by Jerramiah T. Healy
