= Charles Mainor =

American politician (born 1967)

Member of the New Jersey General Assembly from the 31st Legislative District
- In office January 12, 2010 – January 12, 2016 Serving with Anthony Chiappone (2010); Jason O'Donnell (2010-16)
- Preceded by: L. Harvey Smith
- Succeeded by: Nicholas Chiaravalloti; Angela V. McKnight

Personal details
- Born: January 23, 1967 (age 59)
- Party: Democratic
- Education: New Jersey City University (B.S.)
- Occupation: Police Detective

Charles Mainor (born January 23, 1967) is an American Democratic Party politician who served in the New Jersey General Assembly representing the 31st Legislative District. Mainor is a police detective in Jersey City. He succeeded L. Harvey Smith, who did not seek re-election in 2009.

Mainor graduated from New Jersey City University with a B.S. degree in criminal justice. He ran unsuccessfully for the Hudson County Board of Chosen Freeholders twice before his election to the Assembly in 2009.

== Legislative career ==
In the Assembly, Mainor served as chair of the Law and Public Safety Committee. He was also a member of the Consumer Affairs Committee, Transportation and Independent Authorities Committee, and the Joint Committee on Housing Affordability.

After being easily re-elected in 2011 and 2013, Mainor originally sought re-election to the Assembly in the June 2015 despite losing the support of the Hudson County Democratic Committee and Jersey City Mayor Steve Fulop. Ultimately, he dropped out before the Democratic primary election.

New Jersey General Assembly
Preceded by L. Harvey Smith	Member of the New Jersey General Assembly for the 31st District; January 12, 2010 – January 12, 2016; With: Anthony Chiappone, Jason O'Donnell	Succeeded by Nicholas Chiaravalloti; Angela V. McKnight
