= Joseph Charles (disambiguation) =

Joseph Charles (born 1944) is an American politician.

Joseph Charles may also refer to:

- Count Palatine Joseph Charles of Sulzbach (1694–1729)
- Joseph Charles (tennis) (1868–1950), American tennis player, see Tennis at the 1904 Summer Olympics – Men's singles
