= Barbara McCann Stamato =

American politician

Member of the New Jersey General Assembly from the 31st district
- In office January 9, 2024 – January 13, 2026 Serving with William Sampson
- Preceded by: Angela V. McKnight
- Succeeded by: Jerry Walker

Personal details
- Party: Democratic
- Relatives: Gerald McCann (brother)
- Website: Legislative webpage

Barbara McCann Stamato is an American Democratic Party politician who served as a member of the New Jersey General Assembly representing the 31st legislative district from 2024 to 2026.

== Biography ==
A resident of Jersey City, New Jersey, McCann Stamato has served on the New Jersey Democratic State Committee as well as on the Democratic organizations in Hudson County and in Jersey City. She has served as an aide to General Assembly members Louis Manzo and Caridad Rodriguez, and in the office of Jersey City council member Yousef J. Saleh.

== Elective office ==
With Angela V. McKnight running for the State Senate seat that had been held by Sandra Bolden Cunningham, the Hudson County Democratic Organization chose McCann Stamato for the second Assembly seat. McCann Stamato and her incumbent running mate William Sampson defeated Republicans Angelique M. Diaz, Sydney J. Ferreira and two independent candidates in the 2023 New Jersey General Assembly election. McCann Stamato was one of 27 members elected for the first time to serve in the General Assembly, more than one-third of the seats.

In the June 2025 Democratic primary, McCann Stamato bracketed together with Jacqueline Weimmer with the support of Jersey City mayor Steve Fulop, but lost to fellow Democratic incumbent William Sampson and newcomer Jerry Walker, who ran together with the support of the Hudson County Democratic Organization.

=== Committees ===
Committee assignments for the 2024—2025 Legislative Session are:

- Community Development and Women's Affairs
- Transportation and Independent Authorities

== District 31 ==
Each of the 40 districts in the New Jersey Legislature has one representative in the New Jersey Senate and two members in the New Jersey General Assembly. The representatives from the 31st District for the 2024—2025 Legislative Session are:

- Senator Angela V. McKnight (D)
- Assemblywoman Barbara McCann Stamato (D)
- Assemblyman William Sampson (D)

== Electoral history ==
31st Legislative District General Election, 2023
Party	Candidate	Votes	%
Democratic	Barbara McCann Stamato	13,003	34.7
Democratic	William Sampson (incumbent)	12,883	34.4
Republican	Sydney J. Ferreira	4,237	11.3
Republican	Angelique M. Diaz	4,153	11.1
Leadership Experience Values	Mary Jane Desmond	1,724	4.6
Leadership Experience Values	Noemi Velazquez	1,443	3.9
Total votes		37,443	100.0
Democratic hold			
Democratic hold			
