= Anthony Chiappone =

American Democratic Party politician

Member of the New Jersey General Assembly for the 31st district
- In office January 13, 2004 – January 10, 2006
- Preceded by: Joseph Doria; Elba Perez-Cinciarelli
- Succeeded by: Charles T. Epps Jr.
- In office January 8, 2008 – July 16, 2010
- Preceded by: Charles T. Epps Jr.
- Succeeded by: Jason O'Donnell

Personal details
- Born: November 13, 1957 (age 68) Brooklyn, New York, U.S.
- Party: Democratic

Anthony Chiappone (born November 13, 1957, Brooklyn, New York) is an American Democratic Party politician who served in the New Jersey General Assembly, where he represented the 31st Legislative District from 2004 to 2006 and again from 2008 until his resignation in 2010.

In 2009, Chiappone and his wife Diane were indicted on charges of official misconduct and violating campaign finance laws. They originally pleaded not guilty to the charges. In a plea agreement on June 25, 2010, Chiappone pleaded guilty to filing false campaign finance reports, and in exchange the charges against his wife were dropped. As a result of his guilty plea, he was forced to give up his Assembly seat, officially resigning on July 16, 2010.

== Political career ==
Chiappone served in the Assembly on the Health and Senior Services Committee, the Human Services Committee and the Regulated Professions Committee. His legislative office was located at 663 Broadway in Bayonne. He had challenged incumbent Mark Smith in February 2010 to become Mayor of Bayonne, New Jersey.

Chiappone also served as a Councilman-at-Large for the city of Bayonne having won a third four-year term in May 2006 and serving until April 2009 when he resigned. Chiappone had served on the Bayonne City Council since 1998, as a Councilman-at-Large since 2002 and representing Bayonne's First Ward from 1998 to 2002. As a City Council Member, Chiappone sat on the Board of School Estimate Committee, the Bayonne Economic Development Committee, the Cable TV Committee, member of the CDBG Committee, was a member of the Bayonne Economic Opportunity Foundation, and a Commissioner of the Base Local Redevelopment Agency that oversees development of Bayonne's Peninsula.

He simultaneously held a seat in the New Jersey General Assembly and on the City Council. This dual position, often called double dipping, was allowed under a grandfather clause in the state law enacted by the New Jersey Legislature and signed into law by Governor of New Jersey Jon Corzine in September 2007 that prevents dual-office-holding but allows those who had held both positions as of February 1, 2008, to retain both posts.

Chiappone began his career in politics in 1994, when he produced a local Public-access television program called "Bayonne Sunnyside Up," which focused on the community events that take place in Bayonne. Chiappone then created the community action program, "Bayonne Public Forum." Through this Government-access television (GATV) venue, he televised meetings of the Bayonne Municipal Council, Hudson County Board of Chosen Freeholders, local school board meetings and Bayonne Zoning & Planning Board meetings. It was through this civic participation that Chiappone became involved in local government and politics. Chiappone at that time created the civic activist watchdog group called REACT (REsponsible ACTion in Government). As an Independent municipal candidate in 2002 having defeated the Council candidates of his political adversary Bayonne Mayor and Assemblyman of the 31st District Joseph V. Doria, Chiappone was selected by then Jersey City Mayor Glenn D. Cunningham to run on his legislative team in the 31st District. Along with Lou Manzo, Chiappone and Glenn Cunningham defeated Joe Doria's 31st District Democratic team of Joseph V. Doria, L. Harvey Smith and Elba Perez-Cinciarelli in the June 2003 Primary election. Following the death of Glenn Cunningham, Chiappone ran unsuccessfully for Senate against Joseph V. Doria in the Special election to fill the vacancy in November 2004. Chiappone was then defeated in the Democratic Primary in June 2005 by the team of Louis Manzo and Jersey City Superintendent Charles T. Epps Jr. After once again defeating "Team Doria" for the non-partisan 2006 Bayonne municipal election for the position of Councilman At-Large, Chiappone aligned himself with the wife of deceased Glenn Cunningham, Sandra Bolden Cunningham, to once again seek state legislative office in the 31st District. Along with running-mate L. Harvey Smith, Chiappone defeated the team of Nicholas Chiaravrolloti and Sheila Moses-Newton for Assembly in the Democratic primary in 2007, thus essentially winning the election as they were running unopposed in the general election. Chiappone and Smith were sworn in as Assemblyman in January 2008.

== Criminal charges and resignation ==
On August 26, 2009, Chiappone and his wife, Diane, were indicted on seven counts, including theft by deception, official misconduct, tampering with public records, falsifying records, conspiracy, and misrepresentation of contributions or expenditures, having allegedly issued over $8,000 in state-issued paychecks to campaign volunteers in 2005, then diverting the money into his personal accounts and his campaign fund, without declaring it on his campaign finance forms. In spite of the charges against him and calls for his resignation from Governor Jon Corzine and Assembly Speaker Joseph J. Roberts, Chiappone proclaimed his innocence and refused both to resign and to withdraw from his re-election campaign.

The criminal charges against Chiappone meant that both of the 31st legislative district's assemblymen were simultaneously under indictment, as L. Harvey Smith had been arrested on corruption and money laundering charges one month before Chiappone was charged.

Chiappone accepted a plea agreement on June 25, 2010, and subsequently submitted a letter of resignation to Joseph Cryan, Assembly Democratic Leader. Jason O'Donnell, a Democrat in the district, was chosen in July to replace Chiappone and was sworn into the Assembly in September 2010.

== Personal life ==
Chiappone attended York College and Jersey City State College (majoring in Media Arts). Chiappone is a photographer by trade, having owned and operated Kristen Studios Photography and Videography in Bayonne for twenty years. He lives in Bayonne with his wife, Diane.
