= Angela V. McKnight =

Member of the New Jersey General Assembly

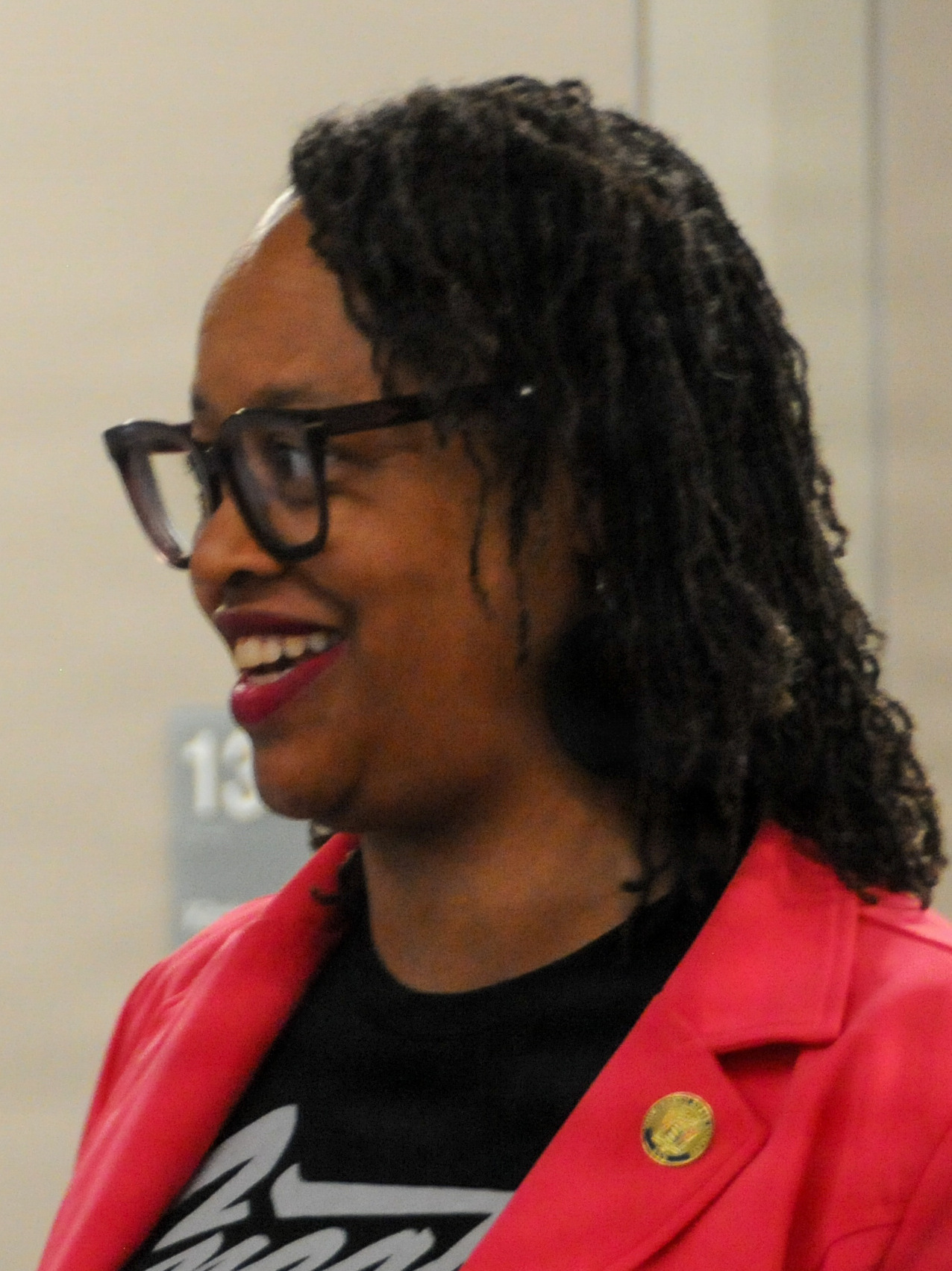
- McKnight speaking in 2026

Member of the New Jersey Senate from the 31st district
- Incumbent
- Assumed office January 9, 2024
- Preceded by: Sandra Bolden Cunningham

Member of the New Jersey General Assembly from the 31st district
- In office January 12, 2016 – January 9, 2024 Serving with: Nicholas Chiaravalloti (2016–2022); William Sampson (2022–2024)
- Preceded by: Charles Mainor and Jason O'Donnell
- Succeeded by: Barbara McCann Stamato

Personal details
- Born: March 10, 1977 (age 49)
- Party: Democratic
- Education: University of Phoenix
- Website: Legislative web page

Angela V. McKnight (born March 10, 1977) is an American Democratic Party politician who has represented the 31st Legislative District in the New Jersey General Assembly since she was sworn into office on January 12, 2016.

A resident of Jersey City, New Jersey, McKnight received a bachelor's degree from the University of Phoenix with a major in business management. She is the founder and chief executive officer of AngelaCARES, an advocacy and support organization for senior citizens.

== New Jersey General Assembly ==
Under the terms of a bill introduced by McKnight in the General Assembly in 2019, students would be required to demonstrate proficiency in the use of cursive handwriting, both reading and writing, by the end of the third grade. McKnight cited the bill as providing children with "a vital skill they will need for the rest of their lives", noting that without cursive skills "how will our students ever know how to read a scripted font on a word document, or even sign the back of a check".

== New Jersey Senate ==
McKnight received the nomination for the Senate seat following the announcement that Sandra Bolden Cunningham would not run for re-election after 16 years in office. McKnight defeated Republican Luis Soto in the 2023 New Jersey Senate election.

=== Committees ===
Committee assignments for the 2024—2025 Legislative Session are:

- Education
- Health, Human Services and Senior Citizens
- Law and Public Safety

== District 31 ==
Each of the 40 districts in the New Jersey Legislature has one representative in the New Jersey Senate and two members in the New Jersey General Assembly. The representatives from the 31st District for the 2024—2025 Legislative Session are:

- Senator Angela V. McKnight (D)
- Assemblywoman Barbara McCann Stamato (D)
- Assemblyman William Sampson (D)

== Electoral history ==
=== Senate ===
31st Legislative District General Election, 2023
Party	Candidate	Votes	%
Democratic	Angela V. McKnight	14,421	75.8
Republican	Luis Soto	4,593	24.2
Total votes		19,014	100.0
Democratic hold			

=== General Assembly ===
31st legislative district general election, 2021
Party	Candidate	Votes	%
Democratic	Angela V. McKnight (incumbent)	26,187	38.30%
Democratic	William Sampson	24,810	36.28%
Republican	Rose Javier	8,817	12.89%
Republican	Brandon Vila	8,565	12.53%
Total votes		68,379	100.0
Democratic hold			

31st Legislative District General Election, 2019
Party	Candidate	Votes	%
Democratic	Angela McKnight (incumbent)	18,432	43.22%
Democratic	Nicholas Chiaravalloti (incumbent)	16,750	39.27%
Republican	Jason Mushnick	3,792	8.89%
Republican	Mary Kay Palange	3,674	8.61%
Total votes		33,893	100%
Democratic hold			

31st Legislative District general election
Party	Candidate	Votes	%	±%
Democratic	Angela V. McKnight (incumbent)	23,616	42.0	▲6.7
Democratic	Nicholas Chiaravalloti (incumbent)	22,823	40.6	▲6.7
Republican	Michael J. Alonso	4,994	8.9	▼5.3
Republican	Lauren DiGiaro	4,766	8.5	▼1.1
Total votes		56,199	100.0	
Democratic hold				

31st Legislative District general election
Party	Candidate	Votes	%
Democratic	Angela V. McKnight	9,597	35.3
Democratic	Nicholas Chiaravalloti	9,212	33.9
Republican	Matthew Kopko	3,872	14.2
Republican	Herminio Mendoza	2,603	9.6
Your Independent Leadership	Anthony Zanowic	958	3.5
Your Independent Leadership	Alejandro Rodriguez	934	3.4
Write-ins	Personal choice	32	0.1
Total votes		27,208	100.0
Democratic hold			

New Jersey General Assembly
Preceded by Charles Mainor and Jason O'Donnell	Member of the New Jersey General Assembly for the 31st District; January 12, 2016 – present With: Nicholas Chiaravalloti, William Sampson	Succeeded by Incumbent
