= Elba Perez-Cinciarelli =

American politician (1943–2020)

Member of the New Jersey General Assembly from the 31st district
- In office January 8, 2002 – January 13, 2004
- Preceded by: Joseph Charles
- Succeeded by: Louis Manzo; Anthony Chiappone

Personal details
- Born: July 27, 1943 Quebradillas, Puerto Rico
- Died: July 3, 2020 (aged 76) Secaucus, New Jersey
- Party: Democratic
- Education: Jersey City State College

Elba Perez-Cinciarelli (July 27, 1943 – July 3, 2020) was an American politician who served in the New Jersey General Assembly from the 31st Legislative District from 2002 to 2004.

Born in San Antonio, Quebradillas, Puerto Rico, Perez-Cinciarelli moved to The Bronx and then to Jersey City, where she graduated in 1974 from Jersey City State College (which has since been renamed New Jersey City University).

She died on July 3, 2020, at age 76. She was buried at Holy Cross Cemetery in North Arlington, New Jersey.
