= Pasculli =

Pasculli is an Italian surname. Notable people with the surname include:

- Antonio Pasculli (1842–1924), Italian oboist and composer
- Patrick Pasculli (1947–2026), American politician, mayor of Hoboken, New Jersey
- Patrick C. Pasculli (born 1939), American politician
- Pedro Pasculli (born 1960), Argentine footballer
