= Nicholas Chiaravalloti =

American Democratic Party politician

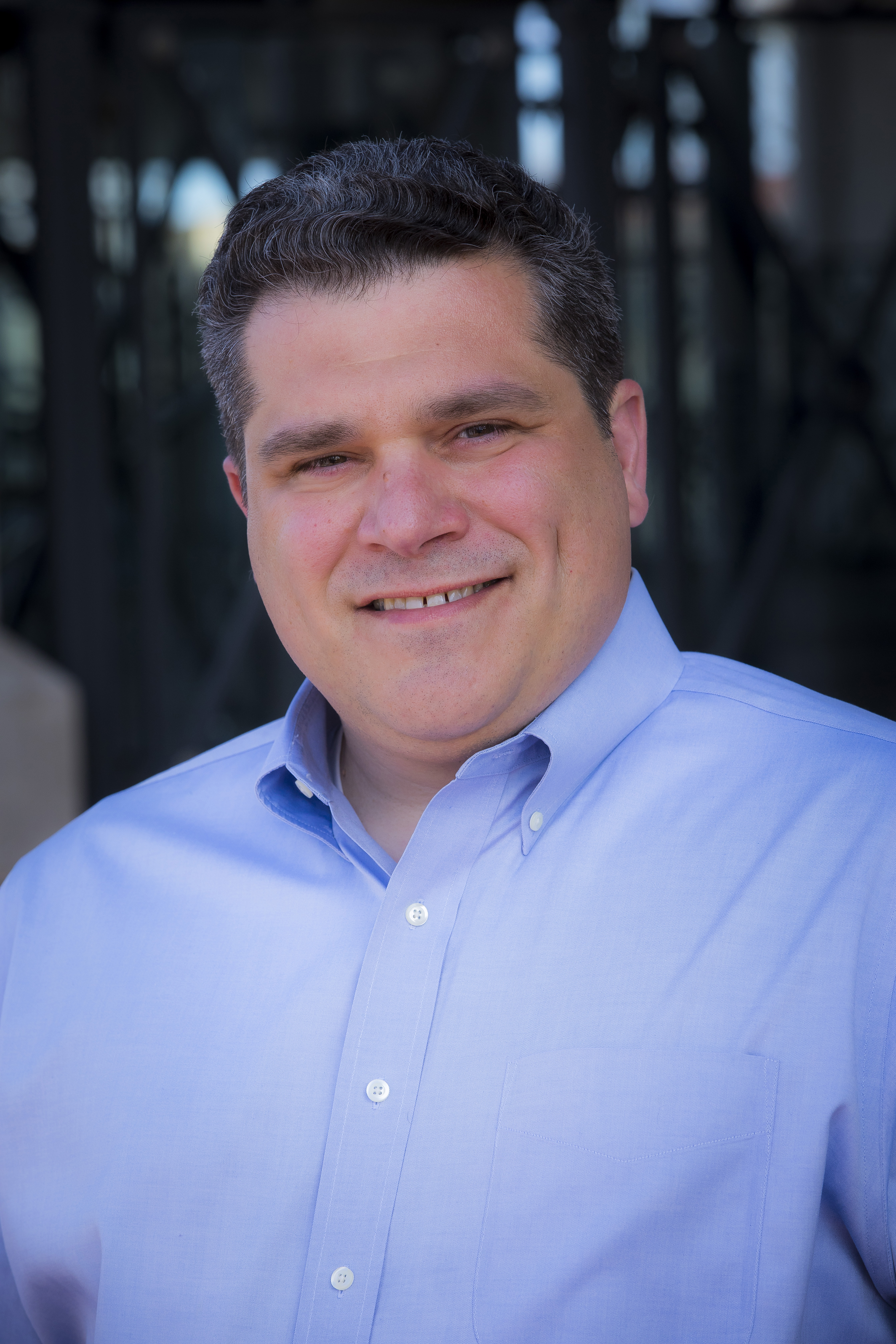

Member of the New Jersey General Assembly from the 31st district
- In office January 12, 2016 – January 11, 2022 Serving with Angela V. McKnight
- Preceded by: Charles Mainor and Jason O'Donnell
- Succeeded by: William Sampson

Personal details
- Born: Bayonne, New Jersey
- Party: Democratic
- Spouse: Nancy Donofrio
- Website: ncforassembly.com

Nicholas Chiaravalloti (born November 28, 1972) is an American Democratic Party politician, who served in the New Jersey General Assembly from 2016 to 2022, where he represented the 31st Legislative District.

== Personal life ==
Chiaravalloti was born and raised in Bayonne, the son of Italian immigrants who came to the United States in the 1950s. He graduated in 1990 from St. Peter's Preparatory School. He received a BA in History from the Catholic University of America. A recipient of a J.D. from Rutgers School of Law–Newark, Chiaravalloti was admitted to the New Jersey Bar in 1998. In 2017, he received a Doctorate in Education from Saint Peter's University.

== Career ==
Chiaravalloti currently serves as the Vice President for External Affairs and Senior Counsel to the President at Hudson County Community College. Formerly, Chiaravalloti was an attorney with the Law Firm of Weiner-Lesniak and worked part-time at Saint Peter's University as Director of Community Engagement in the Advancement Department. He previously served as Executive Director of the Guarini Institute for Government and Leadership. Chiaravalloti is the founder and president of his own consulting firm, Chiaravalloti, LLC, and was a partner in Magis Strategies, LLC. From 2002-2007, Chiaravalloti served as the State Director for the office of United States Senator Robert Menendez.

Chiaravalloti has served on the Board of Trustees for Holy Family Academy and of his alma mater, St. Peter's Preparatory School, as well as of Hudson Cradle and Bergen Community Chest. He also volunteers with Boy Scouts of America, Bayonne Youth Soccer Association and Bayonne Little League.

Chiaravalloti was first elected to the State Assembly in 2015, and was sworn into office on January 12, 2016. In 2018, he was named Deputy Parliamentarian by Assembly Speaker Craig Coughlin. In January 2020, he was named Majority Whip of the Assembly and sat on the Judiciary and Commerce and Development Committees, and also served as the Vice Chair of the Human Services Committee.

Chiaravalloti unexpectedly lost the backing of the Hudson County Democratic Organization in early 2021 after Bayonne Mayor Jimmy Davis threw his support behind longshoreman and union official William Sampson. Chiaravalloti initially planned to seek re-election that year anyways, but ultimately chose to retire.
