= Jerry Walker (politician) =

American politician from New Jersey

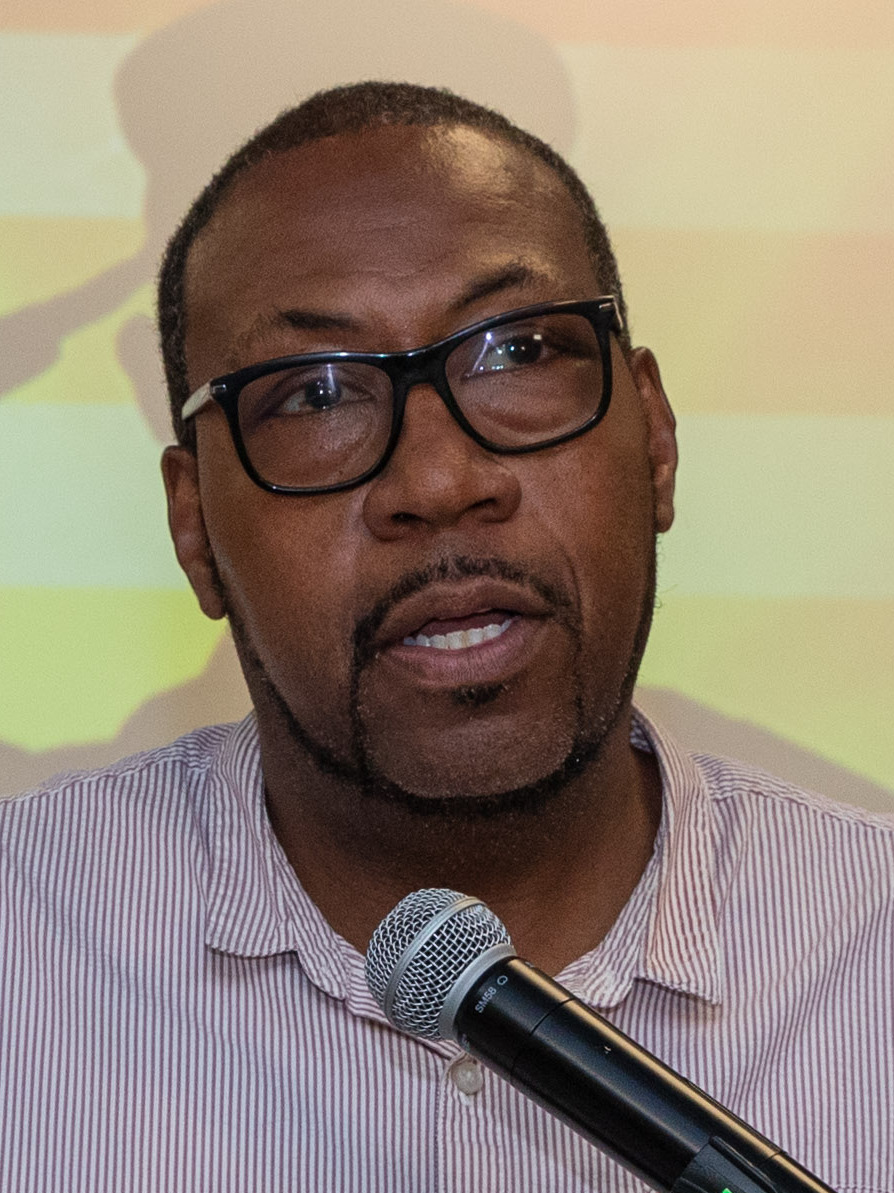
- Walker in 2025

Member of the New Jersey General Assembly from the 31st district
- Incumbent
- Assumed office January 13, 2026 Serving with William Sampson
- Preceded by: Barbara McCann Stamato

Member of the Hudson County Board of County Commissioners from the 3rd district
- In office January 12, 2018 – January 12, 2026
- Preceded by: Gerard Balmir Jr.
- Succeeded by: Celeste Williams

Personal details
- Born: February 5, 1971 (age 55)
- Party: Democratic
- Spouse: ShaRhonda
- Education: Seton Hall University (BA)
- Website: Legislative webpage
- Basketball career

Personal information
- Listed height: 6 ft 7 in (2.01 m)

Career information
- High school: St. Anthony (Jersey City, NJ)
- College: Seton Hall (1990–1993)
- Position: Forward
- Number: 21, 44

Jeremiah Walker (born February 5, 1971) is an American politician, nonprofit executive, and former professional basketball player who has represented the 31st Legislative District in the New Jersey General Assembly since taking office in January 2026. Elected in 2025, he previously served on the Hudson County Board of County Commissioners.

== Early life and education ==
A native of Jersey City, New Jersey, Walker was raised in the Marion Section and graduated from St. Anthony High School where he was coached by Bob Hurley. He attended Seton Hall University and played for the men's basketball team, leading them to three NCAA Division I men's basketball tournament appearances in all three of his seasons, including to the West Regional Final in 1992. He was a part of two Big East Conference tournaments and regular season championships. Known for his defensive intensity, he scored over 1,000 points and pulled down 630 rebounds. He was named the Big East Defensive Player of the Year in 1993 and a two-time All-Big East selection.

He returned to Seton Hall and earned a Bachelor of Arts majoring in communications and minoring in religion studies in 2003.

== Career ==
=== Basketball ===
In 1993, Walker joined the New Jersey Nets then the Atlantic City Seagulls and later played professional basketball for several European teams.

=== Nonprofit work ===
In 1996, Walker and his brother Jasper co-founded Team Walker, a nonprofit focused on inner city children's academic enrichment. In 2011, First Lady of New Jersey Mary Pat Christie honored Walker by naming him a "New Jersey Hero" for his work.

In 2014, The Team Walker Learning Center was built as a community arts center and expanded programming to the entire Hudson County community. Walker also hosts a free Farmers Market for families in District 3 and free G.E.D or ESL classes at the Learning Center.

=== 2013 Jersey City mayoral campaign ===
In 2013, he ran for mayor of Jersey City as an independent. He placed third with 8.30% of the vote.

=== Hudson County Board of Commissioners ===
In 2018, Walker was elected to the Hudson County Board of Chosen Freeholders (renamed the Board of Commissioners in 2020). His primary campaign was supported by the Hudson County Democratic Organization political machine.

=== 2024 congressional campaign ===
Following the death of Donald Payne Jr. death in 2024, Walker announced he would run in the special election to succeed him. He received endorsements from assemblymembers Barbara McCann Stamato and William Sampson. He also received support from Craig Guy, the Hudson County Executive and chair of the Hudson County Democratic Party— which opted not to endorse in the primary.

He placed third in the Democratic primary election with 9.7% of the vote, behind LaMonica McIver's 47.4% and Derek Armstead's 13.6% respectively.

== New Jersey General Assembly ==
In 2025, Walker announced he would run for the New Jersey General Assembly in the 31st Legislative District after initially mulling a campaign for the 2025 Jersey City mayoral election. He garnered endorsements from governor Phil Murphy and U.S. representative LaMonica McIver in the primary election. With the support of the Hudson County Democratic Organization, he placed first in the Democratic primary election, advancing to the general election alongside incumbent William Sampson as well as defeating incumbent Barbara McCann Stamato and Bayonne councilmember Jacqueline Weimmer, who were supported by Jersey City mayor Steven Fulop.

== Personal life ==
Walker is married to his wife, ShaRhonda, with whom he has a son, Chace, and two daughters, Rochelle and Shannon.

== Electoral history ==
=== 2013 ===
Jersey City Mayoral Election, May 14, 2013
Party	Candidate	Votes	%
Democratic	Steven Fulop	20,983	52.94
Democratic	Jerramiah Healy (incumbent)	14,931	37.67
Independent	Jeremiah Walker	3,290	8.30
Independent	Abdul J. Malik	407	1.03
Other	Personal Choice	28	0.07
Turnout		39,639	28.54%
Democratic hold			

=== 2024 ===
2024 New Jersey's 10th congressional district special election, Democratic primary results
Party	Candidate	Votes	%
Democratic	LaMonica McIver	12,507	47.4
Democratic	Derek Armstead	3,596	13.6
Democratic	Jerry Walker	2,568	9.7
Democratic	Darryl Godfrey	1,815	6.9
Democratic	Brittany Claybrooks	1,377	5.2
Democratic	Shana Melius	1,196	4.5
Democratic	Sheila Montague	966	3.7
Democratic	Alberta Gordon	756	2.9
Democratic	John Flora	684	2.6
Democratic	Eugene Mazo	586	2.2
Democratic	Debra Salters	316	1.2
Total votes		26,367	100.0

=== 2025 ===
2025 New Jersey General Assembly Democratic primary election, 31st district
Party	Candidate	Votes	%
Democratic	Jerry Walker	9,067	28.77%
Democratic	William Sampson (incumbent)	7,708	24.45%
Democratic	Barbara McCann Stamato (incumbent)	7,480	23.72%
Democratic	Jacqueline Weimmer	7,274	23.07%
Total votes		31,529	100.00%

2025 New Jersey General Assembly election, 31st district
Party	Candidate	Votes	%
Democratic	Jerry Walker	33,937	37.5%
Democratic	William Sampson (incumbent)	32,516	35.9%
Republican	Anthony Acosta	12,340	13.6%
Republican	Neil Schulman	11,786	13.0%
Total votes		90,579	100.0%
Democratic hold			
Democratic hold			
