= Charles T. Epps Jr. =

American politician

Charles Thomas Epps Jr.

Superintendent of Jersey City Public Schools
- In office September 6, 2000 (approximately) – December 31, 2011
- Preceded by: Dr. Richard A. DiPatri

Member of the New Jersey General Assembly from the 31st district
- In office January 10, 2006 – January 8, 2008 Serving with Louis Manzo
- Preceded by: Anthony Chiappone
- Succeeded by: L. Harvey Smith; Anthony Chiappone

Personal details
- Born: June 13, 1944
- Died: March 17, 2015 (aged 70)
- Party: Democratic
- Education: Bishop College - B.A. in Education; Seton Hall University - Masters in Education; Rutgers University - Doctorate in Education

Charles Thomas Epps Jr. (June 13, 1944 – March 20, 2015) was an American Democratic Party politician, who served in the New Jersey General Assembly from 2006 to 2008, where he represented the 31st legislative district, having taken office on January 10, 2006. Epps was elected to the Assembly on November 8, 2005, filling the seat of fellow Democrat Anthony Chiappone, who lost in the primary in his bid for re-election.

== Biography ==
Epps was the Jersey City Superintendent of Schools. Epps defeated the incumbent Chiappone in the Democratic primary with the support of the Hudson County Democratic Organization.

Epps served in the Assembly on the Environment and Solid Waste Committee and the Health and Senior Services Committee.

In 2000, the State Board of Education approved Epps as the new State District Superintendent for the Jersey City Public Schools. Epps, who had served as the district's Associate Superintendent for Community and Support Services since 1998, was recommended to the board by Commissioner David Hespe. Epps has dedicated his entire education career to the Jersey City School District. Since joining the district as a teacher of grades six and seven at the Whitney M. Young School in 1967, Epps has worked his way up through the ranks of the district as a teacher, supervisor, principal of adult evening programs, and director of funded programs.

Many of Jersey City's record nine Best Practices awards received from the New Jersey Department of Education in 1998-2000 were for programs overseen or founded by Dr. Epps. He took a leadership role in the district's efforts to reduce the drop-out rate, which had fallen from a high of 14.6% to three straight years at 10% or lower, starting in the late 1990s.

Epps has served as Chairman of the Hudson County Community College Board of Trustees, where he helped establish the Opportunity Knocks scholarship program allowing graduating seniors in Jersey City to attend Hudson County Community College tuition-free.

Epps has long been active in the community and serves on several advisory boards, including the National Conference on Community and Justice, the Hudson Cradle advisory board, the Hudson County Schools of Technology advisory board, and the Jersey City welfare board. In 1999, he was recognized by both the NAACP (Outstanding Educator award) and the National Urban League (A Man for All Men award) for his contributions to Jersey City and its public school system.

Epps received a B.A. in Education at Bishop College in Dallas, Texas, followed by a master's degree in education from Seton Hall University and a doctorate in education from Rutgers University.

Epps died after suffering a heart attack on March 17, 2015.

== Criticism ==
There is much criticism of Mr. Epps's pay as superintendent (over $240,000 annually), particularly because Epps also is a member of the New Jersey Legislature ($49,000 annual pay) and the Jersey City Public Schools is one of the lowest performers in the state.

As the Trenton Times editorialized about Mr Epps in an unsigned attack on double-dippers in state government: "Assemblyman Charles Epps Jr., D-Jersey City, spends at least two days a week at the State House, which is time when he's not back home running the troubled Jersey City school district, for which he receives $240,022 a year as superintendent."

In May 2006, Epps fell under attack by Assembly colleagues after the New Jersey 101.5 radio station reported on lavish expenses incurred by Epps on a trip to England—including a $500+/night hotel room—all paid for by taxpayers. A number of politicians called for his resignation as evidence of his fiscal irresponsibility surfaced.

The number (and salaries) of administrative staff housed at the Jersey City Board of Education has increased substantially in the 10 years since Epps became superintendent. Executives on the 8th floor of the Board of Ed Building on Claremont Ave. are notorious for not coming to work before 10 am and leaving early. While the school district is faced with budget cuts, hundreds of teachers received pink slips in April and May, while very few administrators or executives have been laid off, especially Epps's hand-picked assistants. Epps was ousted from the position.

In April 2011, Epps came under criticism for denigrating his constituency in an address to the Interdenominational Ministerial Alliance of Jersey and Vicinity. In his speech, he referred to the young females in his district, as his "worst enemy". He then elaborated, "The young girls are bad. I don't know what they're drinking today, but they're bad." Later, he thanks corporate volunteers for having "signed up to help even the dirty, nasty, bad kids."
