= Jason O'Donnell =

American politician

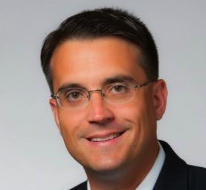

Member of the New Jersey General Assembly from the 31st Legislative District
- In office September 13, 2010 – January 2016
- Preceded by: Anthony Chiappone
- Succeeded by: Nicholas Chiaravalloti; Angela V. McKnight

Personal details
- Born: October 13, 1971 (age 54)
- Party: Democratic
- Spouse: Kerry
- Children: 3
- Education: B.S. New Jersey City University (Fire Science)
- Occupation: Director of Public Safety, City of Bayonne

Jason O'Donnell (born October 13, 1971) is an American Democratic Party politician who serves in the New Jersey General Assembly, where he has represented the 31st Legislative District since September 13, 2010. O'Donnell is the Director of Public Safety for the City of Bayonne where he also serves as the municipal Democratic Committee Chairman. O'Donnell is on leave from his full-time position as a captain in the Bayonne Fire Department.

O'Donnell was chosen by the Hudson County Democratic Committee to succeed Anthony Chiappone, who resigned after pleading guilty to the misuse of campaign funds. O'Donnell won a 2010 special election to complete the remainder of Chiappone's term and was subsequently re-elected to two-year terms in 2011 and 2013. In March 2015, O'Donnell announced he would not seek re-election to a third full term in 2015.

In the Assembly, O'Donnell served on the Financial Institutions and Insurance, the Housing and Community Development, and the Labor Assembly committees. In New Jersey, the Democratic nominee for the gubernatorial election typically gets to select the next chair of the State Democratic Committee. In 2013, Democratic nominee Barbara Buono indicated support for O'Donnell to become the next chair, however through backroom discussions, Passaic County Democratic chair John Currie was selected.

O'Donnell is married to wife Kerry and has two sons and one daughter. They live in Bayonne. He is a graduate of New Jersey City University majoring in fire safety.

New Jersey General Assembly
Preceded by Anthony Chiappone	Member of the New Jersey General Assembly for the 31st District; September 13, 2010 – January 12, 2016; With: Charles Mainor	Succeeded by Nicholas Chiaravalloti; Angela V. McKnight
