= Henry Snyder High School =

High school in New Jersey, United States

Location
- 239 Bergen Avenue; Jersey City, Hudson County, New Jersey 07305; United States
- Coordinates: 40.710444°N 74.083847°W

Information
- Type: Public high school
- School district: Jersey City Public Schools
- NCES School ID: 340783002772
- Principal: Troy Smith
- Faculty: 84.0 FTEs
- Grades: 9-12
- Enrollment: 729 (as of 2024–25)
- Student to teacher ratio: 8.7:1
- Colors: Black and Orange
- Athletics conference: Hudson County Interscholastic League (general); North Jersey Super Football Conference (football)
- Team name: Tigers
- Accreditation: Middle States Association of Colleges and Schools
- Website: hshs.jcboe.org

Academy of the Arts at Henry Snyder High School is a four-year performing arts public high school serving students in ninth through twelfth grades, located in the Greenville section of Jersey City, in the U.S. state of New Jersey, operating as part of the Jersey City Public Schools. The school has been accredited by the Middle States Association of Colleges and Schools Commission on Elementary and Secondary Schools since 1940.

As of the 2024–25 school year, the school had an enrollment of 729 students and 84.0 classroom teachers (on an FTE basis), for a student–teacher ratio of 8.7:1. There were 541 students (74.2% of enrollment) eligible for free lunch and 28 (3.8% of students) eligible for reduced-cost lunch.

== Awards, recognition and rankings ==
The school was the 319th-ranked public high school in New Jersey out of 339 schools statewide in New Jersey Monthly magazine's September 2014 cover story on the state's "Top Public High Schools", using a new ranking methodology. The school had been ranked 279th in the state of 328 schools in 2012, after being ranked 312th in 2010 out of 322 schools listed. The magazine ranked the school 304th in 2008 out of 316 schools. The school was ranked 298th in the magazine's September 2006 issue, which surveyed 316 schools across the state.

Schooldigger.com ranked the school 344th out of 376 public high schools statewide in its 2010 rankings (an increase of 10 positions from the 2009 rank) which were based on the combined percentage of students classified as proficient or above proficient on the language arts literacy and mathematics components of the High School Proficiency Assessment (HSPA).

== Athletics ==
The Henry Snyder High School Tigers compete in the Hudson County Interscholastic League (HCIAA), which is comprised of public and private high schools in Hudson County and operates under the supervision of the New Jersey State Interscholastic Athletic Association. With 883 students in grades 10–12, the school was classified by the NJSIAA for the 2019–20 school year as Group III for most athletic competition purposes, which included schools with an enrollment of 761 to 1,058 students in that grade range. The football team competes in the National Red division of the North Jersey Super Football Conference, which includes 112 schools competing in 20 divisions, making it the nation's biggest football-only high school sports league. The school was classified by the NJSIAA as Group III North for football for 2024–2026, which included schools with 700 to 884 students.

The boys' bowling team won the overall state championship in 1963.

The boys' track team won the Group IV indoor track championship in 1965, 1971 (as co-champion) and 1975 (co-champion).

The boys' track team won the Group IV indoor relay state championship in 1971, 1972 (co-champion with Westfield High School), 1974 and 1975. The boys' track team won the Group IV spring / outdoor track state championship in 1971 (as co-champion).

The boys' basketball team won the Group III state championship in 1990, defeating John F. Kennedy Memorial High School by a score of 65–46 in the tournament final played at the Rutgers Athletic Center and advanced to the Tournament of Champions as the fifth seed, defeating number-four seed Bogota High School by a score of 47–46 in the quarterfinals before falling to top-seeded Elizabeth High School 74–46 in the semifinals to finish the season with a mark of 28–4.

== Administration ==
The school's principal is Troy Smith. His administration team includes three vice principals.

== Notable alumni ==
- Nick Adams (1931–1968), actor who appeared in Hollywood films and on television during the 1950s and 1960s
- Rafael Addison (born 1964), professional basketball player who played in the NBA for the Phoenix Suns, New Jersey Nets, Detroit Pistons and Charlotte Hornets
- Walker Lee Ashley (born 1960), linebacker who played in the NFL for the Minnesota Vikings and Kansas City Chiefs
- Robert Burns (1926–2016), politician who served two terms in the New Jersey General Assembly from the 38th Legislative District
- Albert Burstein (1922–2018), politician who served five terms in the New Jersey General Assembly, representing the 37th Legislative District
- Glenn Cunningham (1943–2004), politician who served in the New Jersey Senate and was the first African American Mayor of Jersey City
- Matthew Feldman (1919–1994), politician who served in the New Jersey Senate and as Mayor of Teaneck, New Jersey
- Leon Gast (1936–2021), film director, producer, cinematographer and editor best known for his documentary When We Were Kings
- Rich Glover (born 1950, class of 1969), 1972 Outland Trophy and Lombardi Award winner; Nebraska (1970-72); NFL 1973, 1975
- Gerald Govan (born 1942), basketball player who played in all nine seasons of the original American Basketball Association
- Mark Granovetter (born 1943, class of 1961), sociologist and professor at Stanford University, best known for his work in social network theory and economic sociology
- Jerry Herman (1931–2019), composer and lyricist
- Otis Hughley Jr. (born 1964, class of 1982), basketball coach who is the head coach of the Alabama A&M Bulldogs men's basketball team
- Derek Luke (born 1974), actor who won multiple awards for his big-screen debut performance in the 2002 film Antwone Fisher
- Bill Perkins (1941–2016), running back in the American Football League for the New York Jets who later became an attorney and politician who served two terms in the New Jersey General Assembly
- Harold Reitman (1950–2025), orthopedic surgeon and professional boxer
- Peter Sliker (1925–2010), opera singer with the Metropolitan Opera
- Shirley Tolentino (1943–2010), first black woman to serve on the New Jersey Superior Court and to be appointed to the Jersey City Municipal Court and serve as its presiding judge
