= Patrick C. Pasculli =

American politician

Member of the New Jersey General Assembly from the 31st Legislative District
- In office January 10, 1978 – January 8, 1980
- Preceded by: Stephen R. Kopycinski; Bill Perkins
- Succeeded by: Joseph Doria

Personal details
- Born: July 20, 1939 (age 87) Hoboken, New Jersey
- Party: Democratic

Patrick C. Pasculli (born July 20, 1939) is an American politician who served in the New Jersey General Assembly from the 31st Legislative District from 1978 to 1980.
