= New Jersey's 31st legislative district =

American legislative district

- Senator: Angela V. McKnight (D)
- Assembly members: William Sampson (D); Jerry Walker (D)
- Registration: 54.3% Democratic; 9.4% Republican; 34.5% unaffiliated
- Demographics: 31.2% White; 22.4% Black/African American; 0.6% Native American; 21.7% Asian; 0.1% Hawaiian/Pacific Islander; 14.2% Other race; 10.0% Two or more races; 25.3% Hispanic
- Population: 260,634
- Voting-age population: 206,103
- Registered voters: 156,818

New Jersey's 31st legislative district is one of 40 districts that make up the map for the New Jersey Legislature. It covers the Hudson County municipalities of Bayonne, Kearny, and most of Jersey City.

== Demographic information ==
As of the 2020 United States census, the district had a population of 260,634, of whom 206,103 (79.1%) were of voting age. The racial makeup of the district was 81,195 (31.2%) White, 58,329 (22.4%) African American, 1,564 (0.6%) Native American, 56,549 (21.7%) Asian, 155 (0.1%) Pacific Islander, 36,894 (14.2%) from some other race, and 25,948 (10.0%) from two or more races. Hispanic or Latino of any race were 65,872 (25.3%) of the population.

The district had 156,818 registered voters as of December 1, 2021, of whom 54,099 (34.5%) were registered as unaffiliated, 85,197 (54.3%) were registered as Democrats, 14,795 (9.4%) were registered as Republicans, and 2,727 (1.7%) were registered to other parties.

== Political representation ==
For the 2026–2027 session, the 31st legislative district of the New Jersey Legislature is represented in the State Senate by Angela V. McKnight (D, Jersey City) and in the General Assembly by William Sampson (D, Bayonne) and Jerry Walker (D, Jersey City).

The legislative district overlaps with New Jersey's 8th, New Jersey's 9th, and 10th congressional districts.

== Apportionment history ==
Throughout the entire history of the 31st district since 1973, the district always consisted of Bayonne and southern Jersey City. In order to fulfill the requirement that legislative districts be made as equal in population as possible, wards were added and removed as necessary from Jersey City to get the necessary population. As the district was always heavily urban in nature and is closely associated with the Hudson County Democratic machine, no Republican has ever been elected to the district since its creation in 1973; one of nine districts statewide to have never sent a member of another party to the Legislature.

== Election history ==
Session	Senate	General Assembly	
1974–1975	James P. Dugan (D)	Joseph A. LeFante (D)	William O. Perkins (D)
1976–1977	James P. Dugan (D)	Joseph A. LeFante (D) (Note: Resigned on January 3, 1977 to take seat in Congress)	William O. Perkins (D)
1976–1977	James P. Dugan (D)	Stephen R. Kopycinski (D) (Note: Elected in June 1977 special election, sworn in on June 27, 1977)	William O. Perkins (D)
1978–1979	Wally Sheil (D)	Patrick C. Pasculli (D)	Charles Mays (D)
1980–1981	Wally Sheil (D)	Joseph Doria (D)	Charles Mays (D)
1982–1983	Edward T. O'Connor, Jr. (D)	Joseph Doria (D)	Joseph Charles (D)
1984–1985	Edward T. O'Connor, Jr. (D)	Joseph Doria (D)	Joseph Charles (D)
1986–1987	Edward T. O'Connor, Jr. (D)	Joseph Doria (D)	Joseph Charles (D)
1988–1989	Edward T. O'Connor, Jr. (D)	Joseph Doria (D)	Joseph Charles (D)
1990–1991	Edward T. O'Connor, Jr. (D)	Joseph Doria (D)	Joseph Charles (D)
1992–1993	Edward T. O'Connor, Jr. (D)	Joseph Doria (D)	Joseph Charles (D)
1994–1995	Edward T. O'Connor, Jr. (D)	Joseph Doria (D)	Joseph Charles (D)
1996–1997	Edward T. O'Connor, Jr. (D)	Joseph Doria (D)	Joseph Charles (D)
1998–1999	Edward T. O'Connor, Jr. (D)	Joseph Doria (D)	Joseph Charles (D)
2000–2001	Edward T. O'Connor, Jr. (D)	Joseph Doria (D)	Joseph Charles (D)
2002–2003	Joseph Charles (D) (Note: Resigned August 18, 2003 to become a Superior Court judge)	Joseph Doria (D)	Elba Perez-Cinciarelli (D)
2002–2003	L. Harvey Smith (D) (Note: Appointed to the Senate on November 24, 2003)	Joseph Doria (D)	Elba Perez-Cinciarelli (D)
2004–2005	Glenn Cunningham (D) (Note: Died May 25, 2004)	Louis Manzo (D)	Anthony Chiappone (D)
2004–2005	Joseph Doria (D) (Note: Appointed to the Senate on June 9, 2004, elected in November 2004 to complete the unexpired term, resigned October 10, 2007)	Louis Manzo (D)	Anthony Chiappone (D)
2006–2007	Joseph Doria (D)	Louis Manzo (D)	Charles T. Epps Jr. (D)
2006–2007	Sandra Bolden Cunningham (D) (Note: Appointed to the Senate on November 8, 2007)	Louis Manzo (D)	Charles T. Epps Jr. (D)
2008–2009	Sandra Bolden Cunningham (D)	L. Harvey Smith (D)	Anthony Chiappone (D)
2010–2011	Sandra Bolden Cunningham (D)	Charles Mainor (D)	Anthony Chiappone (D) (Note: Resigned July 16, 2010)
2010–2011	Sandra Bolden Cunningham (D)	Charles Mainor (D)	Jason O'Donnell (D) (Note: Appointed to the Assembly on July 27, 2010, elected in November 2010 special election to complete the unexpired term)
2012–2013	Sandra Bolden Cunningham (D)	Charles Mainor (D)	Jason O'Donnell (D)
2014–2015	Sandra Bolden Cunningham (D)	Charles Mainor (D)	Jason O'Donnell (D)
2016–2017	Sandra Bolden Cunningham (D)	Nicholas Chiaravalloti (D)	Angela V. McKnight (D)
2018–2019	Sandra Bolden Cunningham (D)	Nicholas Chiaravalloti (D)	Angela V. McKnight (D)
2020–2021	Sandra Bolden Cunningham (D)	Nicholas Chiaravalloti (D)	Angela V. McKnight (D)
2022–2023	Sandra Bolden Cunningham (D)	William Sampson (D)	Angela V. McKnight (D)
2024–2025	Angela V. McKnight (D)	William Sampson (D)	Barbara McCann Stamato (D)
2026–2027	Angela V. McKnight (D)	William Sampson (D)	Jerry Walker (D)

== Election results ==
=== Senate ===
2021 New Jersey general election
Party	Candidate	Votes	%	±%
Democratic	Sandra Bolden Cunningham	26,699	75.3	▼8.6
Republican	Neil A. Schulman	8,769	24.7	▲8.6
Total votes		35,468	100.0	

New Jersey general election, 2017
Party	Candidate	Votes	%	±%
Democratic	Sandra Bolden Cunningham	25,437	83.9	▲10.8
Republican	Herminio Mendoza	4,874	16.1	▼10.8
Total votes		30,311	100.0	

New Jersey general election, 2013
Party	Candidate	Votes	%	±%
Democratic	Sandra Bolden Cunningham	18,822	73.1	▼7.7
Republican	Maria Karczewski	6,932	26.9	▲9.6
Total votes		25,754	100.0	

2011 New Jersey general election
Party	Candidate	Votes	%
Democratic	Sandra Bolden Cunningham	13,275	80.8
Republican	Donnamarie James	2,836	17.3
Eliminate Primary Elections	Louis Vernotico	320	1.9
Total votes		16,431	100.0

2007 New Jersey general election
Party	Candidate	Votes	%	±%
Democratic	Sandra Bolden Cunningham	10,821	87.7	▲20.6
Eliminate Primary Elections	Louis Vernotico	1,511	12.3	N/A
Total votes		12,332	100.0	

Special election, November 2, 2004
Party	Candidate	Votes	%	±%
Democratic	Joseph V. Doria Jr.	34,015	67.1	▼11.9
Unbossed, Unbought Independent	Anthony Chiappone	10,400	20.5	N/A
Servicing The People	John H. Watson	3,202	6.3	N/A
"For The People"	Kabili Tayari	3,073	6.1	N/A
Total votes		50,690	100.0	

2003 New Jersey general election
Party	Candidate	Votes	%	±%
Democratic	Glenn D. Cunningham	15,838	79.0	▲4.9
Republican	Carmen E. Mendiola	3,214	16.0	▼9.9
Green	Eric Olsen	1,005	5.0	N/A
Total votes		20,057	100.0	

2001 New Jersey general election
Party	Candidate	Votes	%
Democratic	Joseph Charles Jr	29,401	74.1
Republican	Martin J. McFadden	10,250	25.9
Total votes		39,651	100.0

1997 New Jersey general election
Party	Candidate	Votes	%	±%
Democratic	Edward T. O'Connor, Jr.	30,993	77.6	▲9.2
Republican	Richard Freda	8,935	22.4	▼9.2
Total votes		39,928	100.0	

1993 New Jersey general election
Party	Candidate	Votes	%	±%
Democratic	Edward T. O'Connor, Jr.	28,358	68.4	▲13.3
Republican	Peter J. Varsalona	13,128	31.6	▼13.3
Total votes		41,486	100.0	

1991 New Jersey general election
Party	Candidate	Votes	%
Democratic	Edward T. O'Connor, Jr.	16,719	55.1
Republican	Bret Schundler	13,601	44.9
Total votes		30,320	100.0

1987 New Jersey general election
Party	Candidate	Votes	%	±%
Democratic	Edward T. O'Connor, Jr.	22,980	78.1	▼2.6
Republican	William V. Connelly	6,437	21.9	▲2.6
Total votes		29,417	100.0	

1983 New Jersey general election
Party	Candidate	Votes	%	±%
Democratic	Edward T. O'Connor, Jr.	23,894	80.7	▲5.3
Republican	Helen Kozak	5,698	19.3	▼5.3
Total votes		29,592	100.0	

1981 New Jersey general election
Party	Candidate	Votes	%
Democratic	Edward T. O'Connor, Jr.	37,863	75.4
Republican	Jean C. Lane	12,348	24.6
Total votes		50,211	100.0

1977 New Jersey general election
Party	Candidate	Votes	%	±%
Democratic	Walter N. Sheil	26,872	70.6	▼8.9
Republican	Edward T. Magee	11,191	29.4	▲8.9
Total votes		38,063	100.0	

1973 New Jersey general election
Party	Candidate	Votes	%
Democratic	James P. Dugan	36,921	79.5
Republican	Henry W. Kolakowski	9,543	20.5
Total votes		46,464	100.0

=== General Assembly ===
2021 New Jersey general election
Party	Candidate	Votes	%	±%
Democratic	Angela V. McKnight	26,187	38.3	▼5.0
Democratic	William Sampson	24,810	36.3	▼3.0
Republican	Rose Javier	8,817	12.9	▲4.1
Republican	Brandon Vila	8,565	12.5	▲3.9
Total votes		68,379	100.0	

2019 New Jersey general election
Party	Candidate	Votes	%	±%
Democratic	Angela V. McKnight	19,440	43.3	▲1.3
Democratic	Nicholas A. Chiaravalloti	17,644	39.3	▼1.3
Republican	Jason Todd Mushnick	3,951	8.8	▼0.1
Republican	Mary Kay Palange	3,837	8.6	▲0.1
Total votes		44,872	100.0	

New Jersey general election, 2017
Party	Candidate	Votes	%	±%
Democratic	Angela V. McKnight	23,616	42.0	▲6.7
Democratic	Nicholas Chiaravalloti	22,823	40.6	▲6.7
Republican	Michael J. Alonso	4,994	8.9	▼5.3
Republican	Lauren DiGiaro	4,766	8.5	▼1.1
Total votes		56,199	100.0	

New Jersey general election, 2015
Party	Candidate	Votes	%	±%
Democratic	Angela V. McKnight	9,597	35.3	▼1.6
Democratic	Nicholas Chiaravalloti	9,212	33.9	▼2.9
Republican	Matthew Kopko	3,872	14.2	▲0.9
Republican	Herminio Mendoza	2,603	9.6	▼3.4
Your Independent Leadership	Anthony Zanowic	958	3.5	N/A
Your Independent Leadership	Alejandro Rodriguez	934	3.4	N/A
Total votes		27,176	100.0	

New Jersey general election, 2013
Party	Candidate	Votes	%	±%
Democratic	Jason O'Donnell	17,954	36.9	▼3.4
Democratic	Charles Mainor	17,877	36.8	▼2.9
Republican	Gerard Pizzillo	6,471	13.3	▲2.6
Republican	Juanita Lopez	6,342	13.0	▲3.7
Total votes		48,644	100.0	

New Jersey general election, 2011
Party	Candidate	Votes	%
Democratic	Jason O'Donnell	11,877	40.3
Democratic	Charles Mainor	11,690	39.7
Republican	Michael J. Alonso	3,157	10.7
Republican	Daniel E. Beckelman	2,751	9.3
Total votes		29,475	100.0

Special election, November 2, 2010
Party	Candidate	Votes	%
Democratic	Jason O'Donnell	19,492	65.8
Republican	Joseph Turula	5,146	17.4
Unbought and Unbossed	Robert Mays	2,516	8.5
For The People	Denis F. Wilbeck	2,463	8.3
Total votes		29,617	100.0

New Jersey general election, 2009
Party	Candidate	Votes	%	±%
Democratic	Charles Mainor	20,528	36.4	▼13.4
Democratic	Anthony Chiappone	20,335	36.1	▼14.1
Republican	Irene Kim Asbury	6,979	12.4	N/A
Republican	Marie Day	6,795	12.0	N/A
Our Future Now	Neil D. Scott	1,284	2.3	N/A
Next Generations Leader	Omar Dyer	476	0.8	N/A
Total votes		56,397	100.0	

New Jersey general election, 2007
Party	Candidate	Votes	%	±%
Democratic	Anthony Chiappone	10,754	50.2	▲9.3
Democratic	L. Harvey Smith	10,665	49.8	▲10.7
Total votes		21,419	100.0	

New Jersey general election, 2005
Party	Candidate	Votes	%	±%
Democratic	Louis M. Manzo	26,179	40.9	▲0.8
Democratic	Charles T. Epps Jr	24,983	39.1	▼0.2
Republican	Andrew Wirtz	6,413	10.0	▲1.8
Republican	Rita A. Howard	6,356	9.9	▲2.4
Total votes		63,931	100.0	

New Jersey general election, 2003
Party	Candidate	Votes	%	±%
Democratic	Louis Manzo	15,588	40.1	▲2.5
Democratic	Anthony Chiappone	15,268	39.3	▲3.6
Republican	Donna Marie James	3,175	8.2	▼4.6
Republican	Stephen Schulz	2,920	7.5	▼4.9
Green	Pamela Olsen	1,023	2.6	N/A
Green	Jonathan J. Oriole	911	2.3	N/A
Total votes		38,885	100.0	

New Jersey general election, 2001
Party	Candidate	Votes	%
Democratic	Joseph V. Doria Jr	29,120	37.6
Democratic	Elba Perez-Cinciarelli	27,637	35.7
Republican	Ira F. Jersey	9,887	12.8
Republican	Ador L. Equipado	9,603	12.4
Together We'll Win	Juanita Lope'z	1,262	1.6
Total votes		77,509	100.0

New Jersey general election, 1999
Party	Candidate	Votes	%	±%
Democratic	Joseph Charles, Jr.	13,274	38.9	▲0.1
Democratic	Joseph V. Doria, Jr.	12,946	37.9	▼1.7
Republican	Richard Freda	4,474	13.1	▲2.2
Republican	Mofalc Meinga	3,467	10.1	▼0.6
Total votes		34,161	100.0	

New Jersey general election, 1997
Party	Candidate	Votes	%	±%
Democratic	Joseph V. Doria, Jr.	31,129	39.6	▲1.1
Democratic	Joseph Charles, Jr.	30,479	38.8	▲0.4
Republican	David J. Longenhagen	8,561	10.9	▲0.6
Republican	Mofalc Olei Meinga	8,415	10.7	▲0.5
Total votes		78,584	100.0	

New Jersey general election, 1995
Party	Candidate	Votes	%	±%
Democratic	Joseph V. Doria, Jr.	20,793	38.5	▲4.4
Democratic	Joseph Charles, Jr.	20,724	38.4	▲4.0
Republican	Artie Williams	5,557	10.3	▼5.6
Republican	Thomas Bragen	5,529	10.2	▼5.5
Conservative	Steven Felton	486	0.9	N/A
Truth Equality Accountability	Omar A. Aziz	482	0.9	N/A
Conservative	Ken Dupey	468	0.9	N/A
Total votes		54,039	100.0	

New Jersey general election, 1993
Party	Candidate	Votes	%	±%
Democratic	Joseph Charles, Jr.	28,013	34.4	▲5.9
Democratic	Joseph V. Doria, Jr.	27,778	34.1	▲5.3
Republican	Michael Miller	12,947	15.9	▼5.7
Republican	Jim White	12,754	15.7	▼5.4
Total votes		81,492	100.0	

1991 New Jersey general election
Party	Candidate	Votes	%
Democratic	Joseph V. Doria, Jr.	17,189	28.8
Democratic	Joseph Charles, Jr.	17,047	28.5
Republican	Michael D. Webb	12,881	21.6
Republican	James Patrick White	12,596	21.1
Total votes		59,713	100.0

1989 New Jersey general election
Party	Candidate	Votes	%	±%
Democratic	Joseph V. Doria, Jr.	33,196	41.2	▲2.7
Democratic	Joseph Charles, Jr.	32,384	40.2	▲1.4
Republican	James J. Richardson	7,499	9.3	▼2.9
Republican	Theresa Lukachyk	7,413	9.2	▼1.2
Total votes		80,492	100.0	

1987 New Jersey general election
Party	Candidate	Votes	%	±%
Democratic	Joseph Charles, Jr.	22,169	38.8	▲8.2
Democratic	Joseph V. Doria, Jr.	21,993	38.5	▲6.7
Republican	James V. McNally, Jr.	6,962	12.2	▼6.9
Republican	Modesto Daniel Fiume	5,947	10.4	▼8.2
Total votes		57,071	100.0	

1985 New Jersey general election
Party	Candidate	Votes	%	±%
Democratic	Joseph V. Doria, Jr.	25,613	31.8	▼8.6
Democratic	Joseph Charles, Jr.	24,612	30.6	▼8.8
Republican	Nat S. Amadeo	15,380	19.1	▲9.1
Republican	Bruce M. Shipitofsky	14,942	18.6	▲9.5
Total votes		80,547	100.0	

New Jersey general election, 1983
Party	Candidate	Votes	%	±%
Democratic	Joseph V. Doria, Jr.	23,585	40.4	▲2.1
Democratic	Joseph Charles, Jr.	22,963	39.4	▲2.3
Republican	Joseph C. Amato, Jr.	5,820	10.0	▼2.5
Republican	George Curtis	5,288	9.1	▼3.0
Community Comes First	Roscoe Evans	691	1.2	N/A
Total votes		58,347	100.0	

New Jersey general election, 1981
Party	Candidate	Votes	%
Democratic	Joseph V. Doria, Jr.	37,343	38.3
Democratic	Joseph Charles, Jr.	36,153	37.1
Republican	Mark A. Baber	12,197	12.5
Republican	Joseph F. Szczesny	11,823	12.1
Total votes		97,516	100.0

New Jersey general election, 1979
Party	Candidate	Votes	%	±%
Democratic	Joseph V. Doria, Jr.	17,171	36.8	▲3.4
Democratic	Charles Mays	16,990	36.4	▲4.4
Republican	Isabella H. Lettieri	5,280	11.3	▼2.4
Republican	Sullivan Johnson	4,011	8.6	▼3.6
Independent	Charles Gerard Barnes	2,131	4.6	N/A
The People's Assemblyman	Joseph Yglesias, Jr.	1,091	2.3	N/A
Total votes		46,674	100.0	

New Jersey general election, 1977
Party	Candidate	Votes	%	±%
Democratic	Patrick C. Pasculli	25,591	33.4	▼5.1
Democratic	Charles Mays	24,530	32.0	▼3.2 (▲29.4)
Republican	Bernard W. Ozarowski	10,531	13.7	▲4.4
Republican	Joseph A. Marzitello	9,349	12.2	▲4.4
For The People	Dorothy Dillin	1,975	2.6	N/A
Independent	James Le Fante	1,881	2.5	N/A
A Better Way	Edward R. Rutkowski	1,538	2.0	N/A
Independent	Michael J. Kucyk, Jr.	1,276	1.7	N/A
Total votes		76,671	100.0	

Special election, June 21, 1977
Party	Candidate	Votes	%
Democratic	Stephen R. Kopycinski	6,472	72.3
Republican	Edward T. Magee	1,268	14.2
For The People	Dorothy Dillin	1,213	13.5
Total votes		8,953	100.0

New Jersey general election, 1975
Party	Candidate	Votes	%	±%
Democratic	Joseph A. LeFante	26,101	38.5	▼2.7
Democratic	William O. Perkins, Jr.	23,894	35.2	▼4.0
Republican	Stanley Marecki, Jr.	6,307	9.3	▼0.9
Republican	Albert Jordan	5,274	7.8	▼1.0
Taxpayer Independent	Joseph M. Tarzia	2,895	4.3	N/A
The Community Speaks	Charles Mays	1,789	2.6	N/A
Restrain Tax League	Herbert A. Warnock	1,622	2.4	N/A
Total votes		67,882	100.0	

New Jersey general election, 1973
Party	Candidate	Votes	%
Democratic	Joseph A. LeFante	37,177	41.2
Democratic	William O. Perkins, Jr.	35,360	39.2
Republican	Peter J. Varsalona	9,176	10.2
Republican	Sullivan C. Johnson, Jr.	7,945	8.8
My Brothers Keeper	Clarence Nicholas	521	0.6
Total votes		90,179	100.0
