= Glenn Cunningham (New Jersey politician) =

American politician

Member of the New Jersey Senate from the 31st district
- In office January 13, 2004 – May 25, 2004
- Preceded by: L. Harvey Smith
- Succeeded by: Joseph Doria

43rd Mayor of Jersey City
- In office July 1, 2001 – May 25, 2004
- Preceded by: Bret Schundler
- Succeeded by: L. Harvey Smith

Personal details
- Born: Glenn Dale Cunningham; September 16, 1943
- Died: May 25, 2004 (aged 60)
- Party: Democratic
- Spouse: Sandra Bolden
- Profession: United States Marine, Police Officer

Glenn Dale Cunningham (September 16, 1943 – May 25, 2004) was an American Democratic Party politician, who was the first African American Mayor of Jersey City, the state's second-largest city, winning the 2001 Jersey City mayoral election. Cunningham also served in the New Jersey Senate.

After Cunningham's death, L. Harvey Smith became the acting mayor of Jersey City. In a November 2004 special election, Judge Jerramiah T. Healy was elected to complete the remainder of Cunningham's term. Joseph Doria was selected to fill Cunningham's Senate vacancy on an interim basis, and won a special election to fill the balance of the term.

== Biography ==
Raised in Jersey City, Cunningham attended Henry Snyder High School, and was inducted into the school's first hall of fame class in 2018.

Before his election as mayor, Cunningham, a former Marine and member of the Jersey City Police Department for 25 years, had been appointed by President Bill Clinton as head of New Jersey's United States Marshals Service Office. He also served on the Hudson County Board of Chosen Freeholders, as Jersey City Council President, and as public safety director of Hudson County. Cunningham died at Greenville Hospital in Jersey City of a heart attack on May 25, 2004, aged 60. He was a Master Mason and full member of the Most Worshipful Oriental Grand Lodge of Free & Accepted Masons in Newark and was buried with Masonic honors in a funerary procession.

Cunningham's widow, Sandra Bolden Cunningham, became a political leader in Jersey City in her own right. She reportedly considered a bid for her husband's State Senate seat in the 2004 special election and a bid for the State Assembly in 2005. In March 2006 signs appeared around Jersey City touting Mrs. Cunningham as a candidate for the United States Senate either in a Democratic Party primary versus her husband's political rival, Sen. Bob Menendez or in the general election against Menendez and Republican State Sen. Thomas Kean Jr. Mrs. Cunningham defeated Assemblyman Louis Manzo in the June 2007 Democratic primary for State Senate and was elected to the Senate in November 2007.

Political offices
Preceded by Bret Schundler	Mayor of Jersey City; 2001–2004	Succeeded by L. Harvey Smith
New Jersey Senate
Preceded by L. Harvey Smith	New Jersey State Senator; 31st Legislative District; January 2004 – May 2004	Succeeded by Joseph Doria
