= Cursive handwriting instruction in the United States =

Penmanship style education in the country

In the United States, cursive handwriting instruction is provided to elementary school children in some schools, with cursive taught alongside standard handwriting. Due to multiple factors including stylistic choices, and technological advancement, the use of cursive has quickly declined since the start of the 21st century.

Cursive has traditionally been used as a way of signing one's name, a signature.

== No Child Left Behind ==
When the No Child Left Behind Act of 2001 was implemented, several changes were made to the classroom curriculum. One of those changes, which has been frequently altered, is the requirement for cursive handwriting. The U.S. Department of Education has provided updates of the changes as they are implemented by school systems.

== Recent events ==
In 2010, the newly-formed Common Core State Standards for English initiative did not include cursive handwriting instruction. In 2011, 41 states adopted the Common Core standards, thus removing the requirement for cursive instruction in the respective state curriculum. When the system was revisited after the skill was taken out of the core requirements, school therapists reported that some students struggled with manuscript but excelled in cursive writing. Many schools have adopted keyboarding as an alternative to cursive handwriting instruction.

Since 2016, several states have reintroduced cursive writing into their curriculum. As of July 2024, there are 25 states that require cursive writing instruction in public schools.
