= Sandra Bolden Cunningham =

American politician (1950–2026)

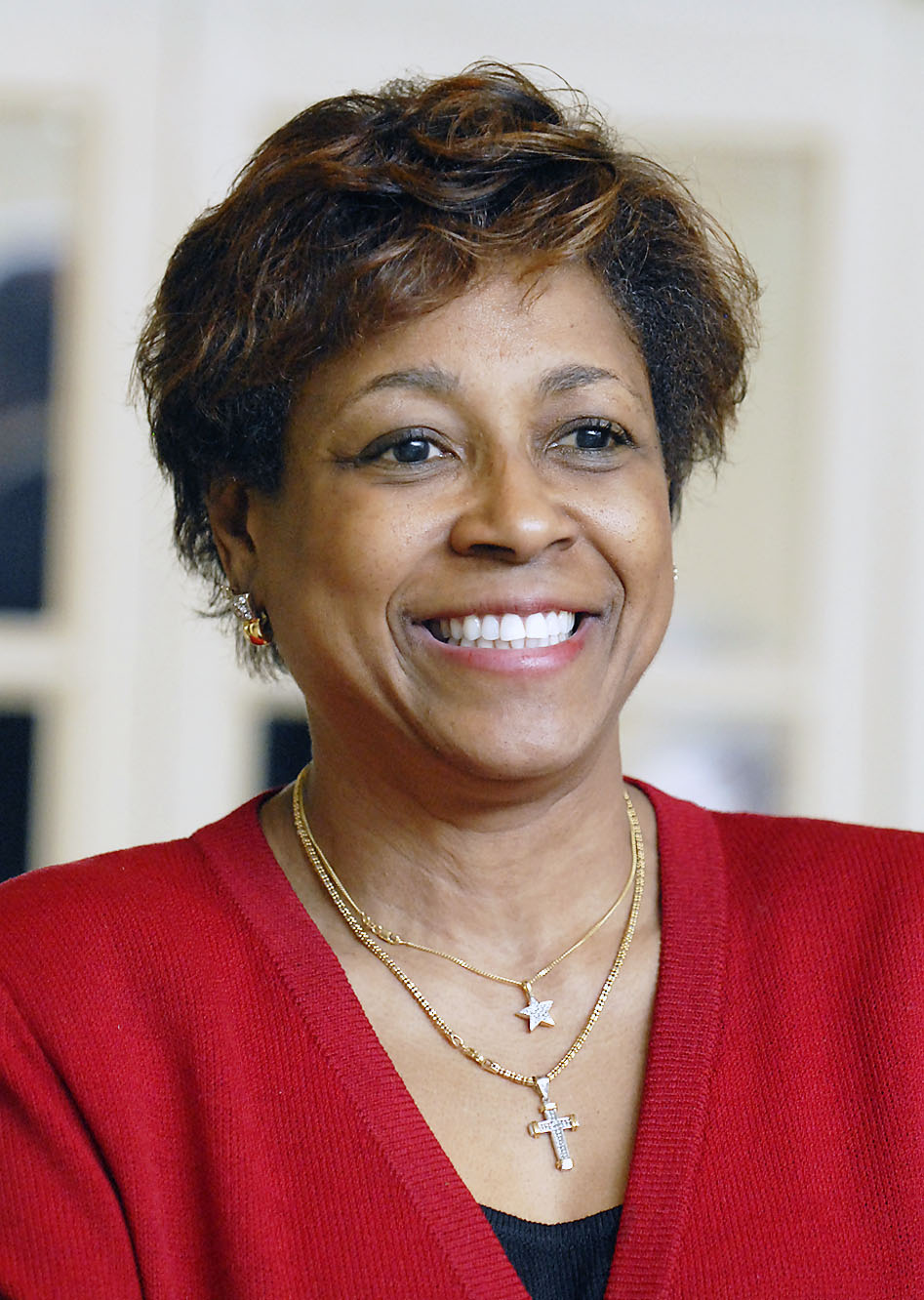

President pro tempore of the New Jersey Senate
- In office January 11, 2022 – January 9, 2024
- Preceded by: Teresa Ruiz
- Succeeded by: Shirley Turner

Member of the New Jersey Senate from the 31st district
- In office November 8, 2007 – January 9, 2024
- Preceded by: Joseph Doria
- Succeeded by: Angela V. McKnight

Personal details
- Born: Sandra Bolden; September 4, 1950 Newark, New Jersey, U.S.
- Died: October 6, 2026 (aged 76)
- Party: Democratic
- Spouse: Glenn Cunningham (m. 1998; died 2004)
- Education: Bloomfield College (BA)
- Website: State Senate website

Sandra Bolden Cunningham (September 4, 1950 – October 6, 2026) was an American Democratic Party politician, who served in the New Jersey State Senate from 2007 to 2024, where she represented the 31st Legislative District. She was sworn into office on November 8, 2007. She was the widow of Jersey City Mayor Glenn Cunningham, who died in 2004.

== Early life and education ==
Sandra Bolden was born on September 4, 1950, and was raised in Newark. She graduated from West Side High School and received a B.A. from Bloomfield College with a major in liberal arts.

== Early career ==
Bolden was an actress and was a part of the Negro Ensemble Company. She became the executive of the Hudson County Bar Association in 1988 after working various county jobs in Essex County.

== Political career ==
Following her husband's death, there were reports of interest by Cunningham to seek her late husband's Senate seat to which he was elected in 2003 and was reported to be considering a run for Mayor of Jersey City in a May 2005 special election. She became president of the Sandra and Glenn Cunningham Foundation and has supported causes in Jersey City through the foundation. In 2006 signs in Jersey City touted her as a candidate for the U.S. Senate vs. Sen. Robert Menendez and State Sen. Tom Kean Jr. Menendez and her late husband were bitter political rivals. She did not seek the U.S. Senate seat and announced her candidacy for the state senate in the Democratic primary against Sen. Joseph Doria in 2007.

Doria, the mayor of Bayonne, dropped out of the race in March 2007. Assemblyman Louis Manzo, who first won his seat on a ticket with Mayor Cunningham, challenged Cunningham in the Democratic primary for the Senate. During the primary race, Cunningham received the support of the Hudson County Democratic Organization and Jersey City Mayor Jerramiah Healy, who had previously opposed her and her late husband. One of Cunningham's running mates for the Assembly was former State Sen. L. Harvey Smith, who had been defeated by her husband in a bitter 2003 Senate primary. Cunningham defeated Assemblyman Manzo in the Democratic primary in June 2007. She was virtually unopposed in the November general election, defeating independent candidate Louis Vernotico with over 87% of the vote.

Following Doria's October 2007 resignation to become Commissioner of the New Jersey Department of Community Affairs, Cunningham was elected on October 23, 2007, by a special election convention to serve the remainder of Doria's term, which expired in January 2008. Cunningham served the remainder of Doria's term before beginning her own four-year term and was sworn into the state senate on November 8, 2007.

In the Senate, she had been assigned to serve as chair of the Higher Education; she also sat on the Budget and Appropriations Committee and Labor Committee. She had been the Senate majority whip since 2008.

In 2012, The Hudson Reporter named her #6 in its list of Hudson County's 50 most influential people, with North Bergen mayor and State Senator Nicholas Sacco ranked first on the list.

Following a prolonged illness in 2022–2023, Cunningham announced that she would not run for reelection in 2023 and would retire from the Senate.

=== District 31 ===
Each of the 40 districts in the New Jersey Legislature has one representative in the New Jersey Senate and two members in the New Jersey General Assembly. The representatives from the 31st District for the 2022—23 Legislative Session were:

- Senator Sandra Bolden Cunningham
- Assemblywoman Angela V. McKnight
- Assemblyman William Sampson

== Personal life and death ==
Sandra Cunningham began dating Jersey City police officer and councilman Glenn Cunningham in 1990 and got married on January 7, 1998, in Nassau, Bahamas. While Glenn Cunningham was campaigning for and later won the Jersey City mayoral election in 2001, Sandra Cunningham often accompanied her husband at public events and political meetings. Glenn Cunningham died on May 25, 2004, of a heart attack.

In 2006, Cunningham pled guilty to operating a vehicle under the influence of drugs or alcohol. The 2006 guilty plea stemmed from a ticketed incident in November 2005. During the incident, she had a blood alcohol concentration of .18, according to public records. She paid a $708 fine.

In March 2021, Cunningham was charged for driving while intoxicated after sideswiping two cars parked near her home with her Infiniti G35x. On 3 June 2021, Cunningham pled not guilty to the DWI and careless driving charges; the charges were later dismissed.

Cunningham died on October 6, 2026, at the age of 76.

== Election history ==
New Jersey State Senate elections, 2021
Party	Candidate	Votes	%
Democratic	Sandra Bolden Cunningham (incumbent)	26,699	75.1
Republican	Neil A. Schulman	8,769	24.7
Democratic hold			

New Jersey State Senate elections, 2017
Party	Candidate	Votes	%
Democratic	Sandra Bolden Cunningham (incumbent)	25,437	83.9
Republican	Herminio Mendoza	4,874	16.1
Democratic hold			

New Jersey State Senate elections, 2013
Party	Candidate	Votes	%
Democratic	Sandra Bolden Cunningham (incumbent)	18,822	73.1
Republican	Maria Karczewski	6,932	26.9
Democratic hold			

New Jersey State Senate elections, 2011
Party	Candidate	Votes	%
Democratic	Sandra Bolden Cunningham (incumbent)	13,275	82.4
Republican	Donnamarie James	2,836	17.6
Democratic hold			

New Jersey State Senate elections, 2007
Party	Candidate	Votes	%
Democratic	Sandra Bolden Cunningham	10,821	87.7
Independent	Louis Vernotico	1,511	12.3
Democratic hold			

Democratic Primary - New Jersey State Senate elections, 2007
Party	Candidate	Votes	%
Democratic	Sandra Bolden Cunningham	10,594	55.8
Democratic	Louis Manzo	8,385	44.2

New Jersey Senate
Preceded by Joseph Doria	Member of the New Jersey Senate for the 31st district 2007–2024	Succeeded by Angela V. McKnight
Preceded by Teresa Ruiz	President pro tempore of the New Jersey Senate; 2018–2024	Succeeded by Shirley Turner
