= William Sampson (politician) =

Member of the New Jersey General Assembly

Member of the New Jersey General Assembly from the 31st district
- Incumbent
- Assumed office January 11, 2022 Serving with Angela V. McKnight (2022–2024); Barbara McCann Stamato (2024–2026); Jerry Walker (2026–present)
- Preceded by: Nicholas Chiaravalloti

Personal details
- Born: January 13, 1989 (age 37)
- Party: Democratic
- Education: Clark Atlanta University; New Jersey City University
- Website: Legislative webpage

William B. Sampson IV (born January 13, 1989) is an American Democratic Party politician who represents the 31st Legislative District in the New Jersey General Assembly since taking office on January 11, 2022.

Born and raised in Bayonne, New Jersey, Sampson graduated from Bayonne High School and then attended Clark Atlanta University, before heading back home and transferring to New Jersey City University.

== New Jersey General Assembly ==
Sampson won the support of Mayor of Bayonne James Davis for the Assembly seat that had been held by Nicholas Chiaravalloti and won the June 2021 Democratic primary. He was elected in the 2021 New Jersey General Assembly election together with running mate Angela V. McKnight and became the first African American state legislator from the city when he took office.

With Angela V. McKnight running for the State Senate seat that had been held by Sandra Bolden Cunningham, the Hudson County Democratic Organization chose Barbara McCann Stamato for the second Assembly seat. McCann Stamato and Sampson defeated Republicans Angelique M. Diaz, Sydney J. Ferreira and two independent candidates in the 2023 New Jersey General Assembly election.

In the June 2025 Democratic primary, Sampson and newcomer Jerry Walker ran together with the support of the Hudson County Democratic Organization and defeated fellow incumbent Barbara McCann Stamato, who bracketed together with Jacqueline Weimmer with the support of Jersey City mayor Steven Fulop.

=== Committees ===
Committee assignments for the 2024—2025 Legislative Session are:

- Consumer Affairs (as chair)
- Labor (as vice-chair)

== District 31 ==
Each of the 40 districts in the New Jersey Legislature has one representative in the New Jersey Senate and two members in the New Jersey General Assembly. The representatives from the 31st District for the 2026–2027 session are:

- Senator Angela V. McKnight (D)
- Assemblyman William Sampson (D)
- Assemblywoman Jerry Walker (D)

== Electoral history ==
31st Legislative District General Election, 2023
Party	Candidate	Votes	%
Democratic	Barbara McCann Stamato	13,003	34.7
Democratic	William Sampson (incumbent)	12,883	34.4
Republican	Sydney J. Ferreira	4,237	11.3
Republican	Angelique M. Diaz	4,153	11.1
Leadership Experience Values	Mary Jane Desmond	1,724	4.6
Leadership Experience Values	Noemi Velazquez	1,443	3.9
Total votes		37,443	100.0
Democratic hold			
Democratic hold			

31st legislative district general election, 2021
Party	Candidate	Votes	%
Democratic	Angela V. McKnight (incumbent)	26,187	38.30%
Democratic	William Sampson	24,810	36.28%
Republican	Rose Javier	8,817	12.89%
Republican	Brandon Vila	8,565	12.53%
Total votes		68,379	100.0
Democratic hold			
