= 2001 Jersey City mayoral election =

- May 8, 2001 and June 5, 2001
Candidate	Glenn Cunningham	Thomas A. DeGise
Party	Independent	Independent
Popular vote	22,232	19,581
Percentage	53.17%	46.83%
Mayor before election
Bret Schundler
Republican
Elected mayor
Glenn Cunningham
Democratic

The Jersey City mayoral election of 2001 was held on May 8, 2001. The mayor is popularly elected in a nonpartisan general election. The incumbent Mayor of Jersey City, Bret Schundler, did not run for re-election.

A runoff held on June 5, 2001. Glenn Cunningham was elected, becoming the first African-American mayor of Jersey City. His opponent in the run-off was Thomas A. DeGise, who later became Hudson County Executive. It was one of the most expensive local races in New Jersey history.

Cunningham died in office before completing his term.

== Candidates ==
- Robert Cavanaugh
- Glenn Cunningham, United States Marshal for the District of New Jersey since 1996, candidate for mayor in 1989, and former Jersey City councilman (1982–90), council president (1986–90) and Hudson County freeholder (1976–79) (Democratic)
- Tom DeGise, president of the Jersey City Council since 1993 (Democratic)
- Louis Manzo, former Hudson County freeholder (1990–93) and candidate for mayor in 1992 and 1993 (Democratic)
- Kevin Sluka

=== Disqualified ===
- Gerald McCann, former mayor of Jersey City (1981–85, 1989–92) and convicted criminal (Democratic)

== Results ==
Candidate	Vote Count	Percent
Glenn Dale Cunningham	14,392	38.61%
Thomas A. DeGise	9,008	24.17%
Louis Manzo	7,618	20.44%
Kevin Sluka	3,439	9.23%
Robert Cavanaugh	2,817	7.56%

Gerald McCann, who had served two non-consecutive terms as Mayor of Jersey City before being convicted of fraud in a savings-and-loan scam, attempted to file a petition to run but was barred from doing so.

Runoff

Candidate	Vote Count	Percent
Glenn Dale Cunningham	22,232	53.17%
Thomas A. DeGise	19,581	46.83%
