= Joseph Doria =

American politician

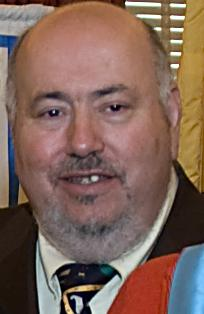

New Jersey Commissioner of Community Affairs
- In office October 10, 2007 – July 23, 2009
- Governor: Jon Corzine
- Preceded by: Susan Bass Levin
- Succeeded by: Charles Richman

Member of the New Jersey Senate from the 31st district
- In office June 9, 2004 – October 10, 2007
- Preceded by: Glenn Cunningham
- Succeeded by: Sandra Bolden Cunningham

Mayor of Bayonne, New Jersey
- In office July 1998 – October 2007
- Preceded by: Leonard P. Kiczek
- Succeeded by: Terrence Malloy

Speaker of the New Jersey General Assembly
- In office 1990–1992
- Preceded by: Chuck Hardwick
- Succeeded by: Chuck Haytaian

Member of the New Jersey General Assembly from the 31st district
- In office January 8, 1980 – January 13, 2004
- Preceded by: Patrick C. Pasculli
- Succeeded by: Anthony Chiappone; Louis Manzo

Personal details
- Born: June 28, 1946 (age 80)
- Party: Democratic
- Education: Saint Peter's College; Columbia University

Joseph V. Doria Jr. (born June 28, 1946) is an American Democratic Party politician, who served as Commissioner of the New Jersey Department of Community Affairs in the cabinet of Governor Jon Corzine from 2007 until his resignation in July 2009. He is a former Speaker of the New Jersey General Assembly, State Senator for the 31st Legislative District, and a former Mayor of Bayonne, a position he held from July 1998 to October 2007.

== Biography ==
On June 9, 2004, Doria was unanimously chosen by the Democratic County Committee members from the 31st Legislative District to fill the vacancy as interim Senator following the death of Jersey City Mayor and Senator Glenn Cunningham. He was elected to the remainder of Cunningham's Senate term in a 2004 special election, defeating then Assemblyman Anthony Chiappone. While his Senate term was scheduled to expire in January 2008, he resigned in October 2007 to become community affairs commissioner.

While a state senator, Commissioner Doria was the Vice Chairman of the Senate Economic Growth Committee, Vice Chairman of the Senate Education Committee, Vice Chairman of the Senate Labor Committee, a member of the Senate Budget & Appropriations Committee and a member of the Joint Committee on the Public Schools. Doria was also a member of the Mayors Against Illegal Guns Coalition, a bi-partisan group with a stated goal of "making the public safer by getting illegal guns off the streets." The Coalition is co-chaired by Boston Mayor Thomas Menino and New York City Mayor Michael Bloomberg.

Before entering the Senate, Doria spent a long career in the General Assembly, the lower house of the New Jersey Legislature, serving from 1980 to 2004. During his time in the Assembly he served as Minority Leader (1992–2001), Deputy Minority Leader (1988–1989), Minority Conference Leader (1986–1987), Majority Conference Chair (1984–1985), and finally as Speaker of the General Assembly from 1990 to 1991. While in the Assembly he was the first Chairman of the Higher Education Committee and served his final term as Chairman of the Education Committee. He was defeated for reelection to his Assembly seat in the June 2003 Democratic primary and left the Assembly when his term expired in January 2004. His absence from Trenton lasted six months, before his return as a state senator.

Doria was elected to the Bayonne Board of Education in 1975, served as board president from 1976 to 1979, and also was President of the Hudson County School Boards Association from 1978 to 1979.

Serving for nearly a quarter century in the New Jersey General Assembly, Doria sponsored more than 240 bills that were signed into law. During his years in the Assembly, Doria authored major pieces of legislation in the areas of education, consumer protection, healthcare and transportation. He is responsible for measures to decrease state bureaucracy, especially in the areas of environmental protection and healthcare. Doria was the sponsor of laws giving New Jersey's public colleges and universities greater autonomy. He also wrote the legislation allowing new mothers to stay in the hospital 48 hours after giving birth. Doria was the founding chair of the Assembly Higher Education Committee and chaired the Assembly Education Committee.

In 2004, Doria's name was suggested as President of Ramapo College, a position that was supported by then-Acting Governor Richard Codey and his predecessor Jim McGreevey (before he had resigned). The school's board of trustees ignored what had been called an "academic coup" to install Doria as president, and a search committee left his name off of a list of finalists for the position, leading Doria to abandon his pursuit of the appointment.

In March 2007, Doria announced he would not seek a second term in the State Senate. On September 21, 2007, Corzine nominated Doria as Commissioner of the New Jersey Department of Community Affairs (DCA), replacing Susan Bass Levin. Doria resigned his Senate seat and his mayoralty and assumed the commissionership on an acting basis on October 10, 2007. He was confirmed by the State Senate on November 29, 2007.

Governor Corzine announced Doria's resignation as Commissioner of the Department of Community Affairs, in the wake of a corruption probe in which his home in Bayonne and his office in Trenton were raided. Though Doria had not been included in a series of arrests, 44 people had been taken into custody as part of a wide-ranging probe known as Operation Bid Rig. Doria was cleared of all charges by the U.S. Attorney's office in October 2011.

== Education ==
Doria graduated from Marist High School in Bayonne. He received a B.A. degree from Saint Peter's College in History, an M.A. from Boston College in American Studies and was awarded an Ed.D. from Columbia University Teachers College.

Preceded by Chuck Hardwick	Speaker of the New Jersey General Assembly; 1990 – 1992	Succeeded by Chuck Haytaian
Preceded by Glenn Cunningham	New Jersey State Senator; 31st Legislative District; June 2004 – October 2007	Succeeded by Sandra Bolden Cunningham
Preceded by Susan Bass Levin	New Jersey Commissioner of Community Affairs; October 2007 – July 2009	Succeeded by Charles Richman
