= Bill Perkins (American football) =

American football player (1940–2016)

No. 20, 33, 30
- Position: Running back

Personal information
- Born: January 12, 1940; Jersey City, New Jersey, U.S.
- Died: February 5, 2016 (aged 76); Teaneck, New Jersey, U.S.
- Listed height: 6 ft 2 in (1.88 m)
- Listed weight: 225 lb (102 kg)

Career information
- High school: Jersey City (NJ) Snyder
- College: Iowa
- NFL draft: 1963: 12th round, 160th overall pick

Career history
- Dallas Cowboys (1963)*; New York Jets (1963); Jersey City Giants (1964); Newark Bears (1965); Jersey Jets (1965-1966); Westchester Bulls (1967); Bridgeport Jets (1968)
- * Offseason or practice squad member only

Career AFL statistics
- Rushing yards: 8
- Rushing average: 2.7
- Return yards: 55
- Stats at Pro Football Reference

William Osborne Perkins II (January 12, 1940 – February 5, 2016) was a criminal defense attorney who served two terms in the New Jersey General Assembly and also played in four games as a running back for the New York Jets.

== Biography ==
=== Early life ===
Perkins was born in Jersey City, New Jersey, to Eva Trotman Perkins and William Osborne Perkins. His mother died when he was a boy and his father remarried. He graduated from Henry Snyder High School in 1959, where he practiced football and track & field.

=== College football ===
Perkins accepted a football scholarship from the University of Iowa. As a junior, he played fullback, registering 62 carries for 380 yards (led the team) and 2 rushing touchdowns. His 6.1-yard average led the team and was second in the Big Ten Conference. As a senior, he was third on the team with 48 carries for 237 yards (4.0-yard avg.) and no touchdowns. He finished his college career with 110 carries for 617 yards, a 5.6-yard average and 2 rushing touchdowns.

=== Professional football ===
Perkins was selected by the Dallas Cowboys in the 12th round (160th overall) of the 1963 NFL draft. He was waived in September due to an injury and was signed to the New York Jets' taxi squad. On November 1, he was promoted to the regular roster. He was a backup halfback and kickoff returner and played in 4 games. He was released on September 8, 1964.

=== Law and political career ===
Perkins enrolled in Seton Hall Law School in 1965 and graduated in 1968. While attending law school he played football for the Westchester Bulls of the Atlantic Coast Football League. He formed his law office in 1970 in Jersey City as a criminal defense attorney. He represented Bayonne and Jersey City (the 31st district) in the New Jersey General Assembly from 1974 to 1978. He was a member of the American Council of Young Political Leaders and traveled to the Soviet Union. He was the first African American president of the Hudson County Bar Association. He was disbarred by the Supreme Court of New Jersey in 2000 by consent.

=== Other activities ===
Perkins was also an assistant football coach at Saint Peter's University. From 2001 to 2010, he was the assistant director for the New Jersey Recreation Department.

== Personal life ==
His uncle was Don Perkins, who also played running back in the NFL. He was fluent in English, Spanish, Russian, French, and Polish.

On February 5, 2016, Perkins died in Teaneck, New Jersey, survived by four children, including hedge fund manager Bill Perkins.
