= Joseph Charles =

American politician

Joseph Charles, Jr

Superior Court Judge

Personal details
- Born: January 6, 1944 (age 82)
- Party: Democratic
- Education: Rutgers University, Camden

Joseph Charles, Jr. (born January 6, 1944) is an American Democratic Party politician.

== Early life and education ==
Charles graduated with a B.A. from Rutgers University in Chemistry, and was awarded a J.D. from Rutgers School of Law–Newark.

== Career ==
Charles served in the New Jersey Senate from 2002 to 2003, where he represented the 31st Legislative District. He had also served in the lower house of the New Jersey Legislature, the General Assembly, from 1982 to 2002. He currently serves as a Judge of the New Jersey Superior Court, a position he was appointed to in 2003 by then Gov. James McGreevey.

Charles resigned from his seat in the Senate effective August 18, 2003, and was replaced by L. Harvey Smith.

He served in the Senate on the Labor Committee (as Co-Chair) and the Budget and Appropriations Committee.

While in the Assembly, he served as Minority Leader Pro Tempore from 1997 to 2001, Minority Budget Officer from 1998 to 1999, Assistant Minority Leader from 1994 to 1995, Associate Minority Leader from 1992 to 1993 and again from 1996 to 1997, and as Assistant Majority Leader from 1990 to 1991. He has been an attorney with the firm of Ashley and Charles, and served as a Deputy Attorney General from 1970 to 1971.

=== Other work ===
In 2020 Charles joined a committee to review police policies in New Jersey. The committee was formed in response to national protest against police brutality.

New Jersey Senate
| Preceded by Edward T. O'Connor, Jr. | New Jersey State Senator; 31st Legislative District; January 8, 2002 – August 18, 2003 | Succeeded by L. Harvey Smith |
