= Louis Manzo =

American politician

Louis Manzo (born February 28, 1955, in Jersey City, New Jersey) is an American Democratic Party politician who served in the New Jersey General Assembly from 2004 to 2008, where he represented the 31st legislative district, and who ran unsuccessfully for Mayor of Jersey City, New Jersey.

== Biography ==
Manzo received a B.A. from Jersey City State College in health education. He began his career as a sanitarian with the Jersey City Health Division in 1977.

== Political career ==
Manzo unsuccessfully ran for mayor of Jersey City five times in the following elections.

Year	Opponent
1992	Bret Schundler (R)
1993	Bret Schundler (R)
2001	Glenn D. Cunningham (D)
2004	Jerramiah T. Healy (D)
2009	Jerramiah T. Healy (D)

In June 2007, he overwhelmingly lost a bid in the Democratic primary for a seat in the State Senate to Sandra Bolden Cunningham.

=== 2009 race for Mayor of Jersey City ===
In December 2008, Manzo announced that he would wage an uphill campaign for mayor of Jersey City against incumbent Mayor Jerramiah Healy. Though finishing in second place in a field of five candidates, Manzo was unable to force a runoff against Healy. Manzo won 26% of the vote, compared to 53% for Healy.

=== Arrest on corruption charges ===
Manzo was one of 44 people arrested on July 23, 2009, as part of Operation Bid Rig, a joint operation of the FBI, IRS, and the U.S. Attorney's Office for the District of New Jersey into corruption and money laundering. Manzo was charged with taking $27,500 in corrupt cash payments for use in his failed Jersey City mayoral campaign. Manzo was charged with two counts of extortion under the federal Hobbs Act, but in May 2010, U.S. District Court Judge Jose L. Linares dismissed the charges, ruling that the act only applies to elected officials. Manzo then faced two counts of violating the Travel Act, charging him with crossing state lines to commit a crime, and two counts of failing to report to authorities that others were collecting bribes. On February 17, 2012, all remaining charges against Manzo were dismissed by Linares.

Manzo filed suit to have his legal costs reimbursed by the government, but a court denied his claim.

== Author ==
The book Ruthless Ambition: The Rise and Fall of Chris Christie authored by Manzo was released in April 2014.
