= 1997 Jersey City mayoral election =

- June 24, 1997

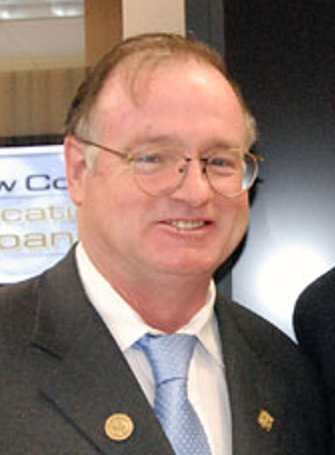
Candidate	Bret Schundler	Jerramiah Healy
Party	Nonpartisan	Nonpartisan
Popular vote	25,115	17,933
Percentage	58.3%	41.7%
Mayor before election
Bret Schundler
Nonpartisan
Elected mayor
Bret Schundler
Nonpartisan

The 1997 Jersey City mayoral election was held on June 25, 1997. Incumbent mayor Bret Schundler, who won a special election in 1992 and was re-elected to a full term in 1993, was elected to a second consecutive term over Jerramiah Healy. In the primary election held on May 14, Schundler was nearly re-elected by securing a majority of the vote, but he received two votes fewer than necessary.

== Background ==
Bret Schundler, a conservative Republican, was elected mayor of Jersey City in November 1992 with under 18 percent of the vote. He was elected to succeed Gerald McCann, who had been convicted on federal bank fraud charges and removed from office. Schundler's victory despite his extremely small plurality was attributed to Jersey City's special election rules, which did not require a majority for election.

At the time Schundler took office, Jersey City was notorious for political corruption, and the city government faced a $40 million budget deficit, rising crime, and a failing school system. Young middle-class residents fled the city for the suburbs, leaving the city with an aging population and shrinking property tax base from which to fund services. He was re-elected in 1993 against unified Democratic opposition; his victory in an overwhelmingly Democratic city elevated him to the status of a national political celebrity by 1994.

During his first term in office, Schundler cut property taxes and public spending while increasing beat cops and establishing "neighborhood improvement districts," devolving some municipal bureaucratic authority to local control. More importantly, however, he dismantled the city's patronage system, bypassing the Democratic Party and municipal unions in favor of a merit-based approach. Nevertheless, some problems persisted, including a $20 million budget shortfall in 1996.

== Candidates ==
- Jerramiah Healy, former chief municipal judge (Democratic)
- Bret Schundler, incumbent mayor since 1992 (Republican)

=== Disqualified ===
- Gerald McCann, former mayor of Jersey City (1981–85, 1989–92) (Democratic)

== Campaign ==
As in 1993, Schundler was opposed by the Hudson County Democratic Organization. Initially, his strongest opponent appeared to be former mayor Gerald McCann, who had been released from federal prison in 1995 and announced a campaign for a third nonconsecutive term in February 1997. McCann had consistently maintained that his 1992 conviction was the result of a partisan attack by President George H. W. Bush and began seeking a return to office while he was still living in a Manhattan halfway house. After the office of attorney general Peter Verniero confirmed that McCann could seek office, he began campaigning in earnest, assembling a City Council slate and publicly apologizing for his campaign's efforts to suppress the minority vote in 1985.

However, on March 30, 1997, acting on a tip from the Jerramiah Healy campaign, Verniero announced that McCann was still on supervised release from federal prison and was therefore ineligible for office. The ballot drawing was postponed after McCann challenged the decision in court, but Superior Court judge Arthur D'Italia ruled on April 4 that McCann could not run. The ruling was upheld by the Supreme Court of New Jersey.

With McCann out of the race, Schundler faced Healy and city councilman Jaime Vazquez. During the campaign, Healy accused Schundler of doing too little to reduce crime or create jobs, emphasizing that Schundler was raised in the affluent suburb of Westfield and portraying him as "out of town, out of touch and out of time." The New York Times characterized Healy as "folksy."

== Primary results and recount ==
Candidate	Votes	Percent
Bret Schundler	19,744	50.01%
Jerramiah Healy	12,309	40.92%
Jaime Vazquez	3,400	8.61%
Write-in	181	0.46%
Votes	39,482	100.00%

Although the initial official count showed Schundler winning with 19,774 votes or 50.01 percent of the total vote, without any need for a run-off. However, Healy challenged the results, and Superior Court judge Arthur D'Italia found that Schundler had received only 19,737 votes, two fewer than a majority of a new total of 39,482 votes, following a recount and the further deduction of seven overage votes.

On June 9, Schundler withdrew his challenge and accepted the runoff. Vazquez endorsed Schundler in the runoff.

== Runoff campaign and results ==
The mayoral runoff was the fourth election in the city in six weeks.

Following the primary, local Democratic organizations raised $100,000 for Healy's campaign, while Schundler claimed tor raise $120,000, including a $50,000 personal loan. Schundler also had $50,000 remaining from the primary campaign; his campaign spent heavily on direct campaign mailing.

Schundler won easily.

Candidate	Votes	Percent
Bret Schundler	25,115	58.34%
Jerramiah Healy	17,933	41.66%
Votes	43,048	100.00%

== Aftermath ==
Schundler later ran unsuccessfully for governor of New Jersey in 2001 and 2005 before briefly serving as Commissioner of Education in the cabinet of Governor Chris Christie in 2010.

Healy was later elected mayor in a 2004 special election and re-elected in 2005 and 2009. He was defeated by Steven Fulop in 2013.
