= 2004 Jersey City mayoral special election =

- November 2, 2004
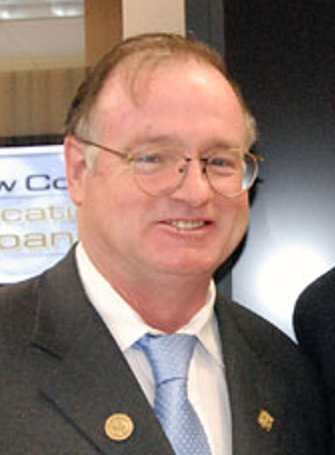
Candidate	Jerramiah Healy	Louis Manzo	L. Harvey Smith
Party	Nonpartisan	Nonpartisan	Nonpartisan
Popular vote	17,401	15,159	13,672
Percentage	27.78%	24.20%	21.83%
Candidate	Willie L. Flood	Steve Lipski
Party	Nonpartisan	Nonpartisan
Popular vote	9,286	3,946
Percentage	14.82%	6.30%
Mayor before election
L. Harvey Smith
Democratic
Elected mayor
Jerramiah Healy
Democratic

The Jersey City 2004 mayoral special election was held on November 2, 2004 to elect a successor to Glenn Cunningham, who died in office of a heart attack. Jerramiah Healy won the election with 28 percent of the vote over his nearest rivals Lou Manzo and acting mayor L. Harvey Smith.

The election was marked by attempts to claim the legacy of deceased Mayor Cunningham, innuendo, and a picture of the eventual winner drunk and naked on his front porch.

== Candidates ==
The candidates were as follows:

- Dwayne Baskerville
- Willie L. Flood, former Jersey City councilor and candidate in the 1992 special mayoral election (Democratic)
- Isaiah J. Gadsden
- Jerramiah Healy, former chief municipal judge and candidate in the 1997 mayoral election (Democratic)
- Steve Lipski, Jersey City councilor (Democratic)
- Hosam Mansour
- Louis Manzo, state assemblyman, former Hudson County freeholder, and candidate for mayor in 1992 and 1993 (Democratic)
- Hilario Nunez, Jr.
- Alfred Marc Pine
- Thomas Short
- L. Harvey Smith, acting mayor and former state senator (Democratic)

== Results ==
Jersey City mayoral special election, 2004
Party	Candidate	Votes	%
Nonpartisan	Jerramiah Healy	17,401	27.78
Nonpartisan	Louis M. Manzo	15,159	24.20
Nonpartisan	L. Harvey Smith	13,672	21.83
Nonpartisan	Willie L. Flood	9,286	14.82
Nonpartisan	Steve Lipski	3,946	6.30
Nonpartisan	Hilario Nunez, Jr.	759	1.21
Nonpartisan	Hosam Mansour	633	1.01
Nonpartisan	Dwayne Baskerville	594	0.95
Nonpartisan	Isaiah J. Gadsden	482	0.77
Nonpartisan	Alfred Marc Pine	449	0.72
Nonpartisan	Thomas Short	219	0.35
Write-In	Personal Choice	41	0.07
Total votes		62,641	100.00

== Aftermath ==
Healy won an election to the next full term in 2005. He was re-elected in 2009 and defeated by Steven Fulop in 2013.
