= 2025 Jersey City mayoral election =

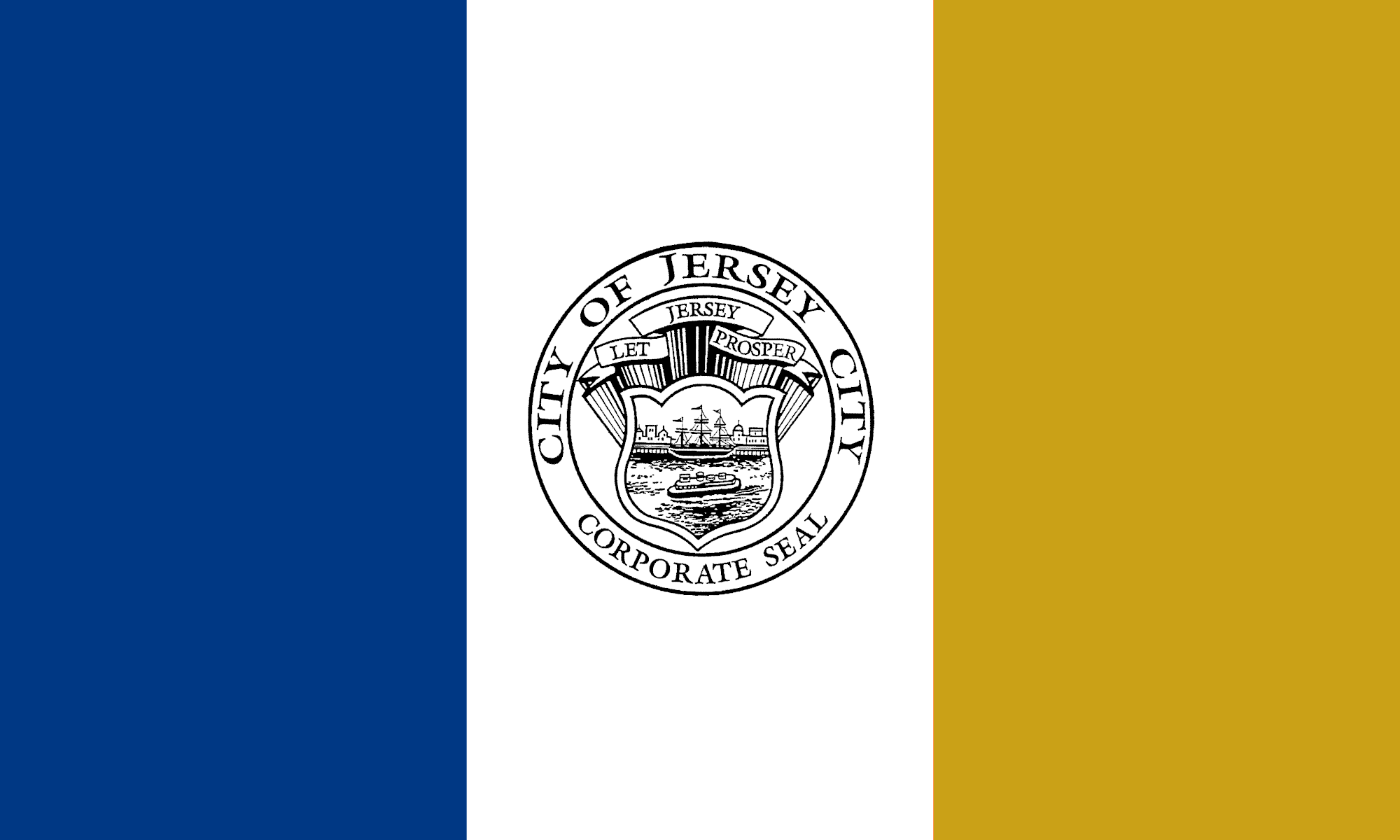
- November 4, 2025 (first round); December 2, 2025 (runoff)
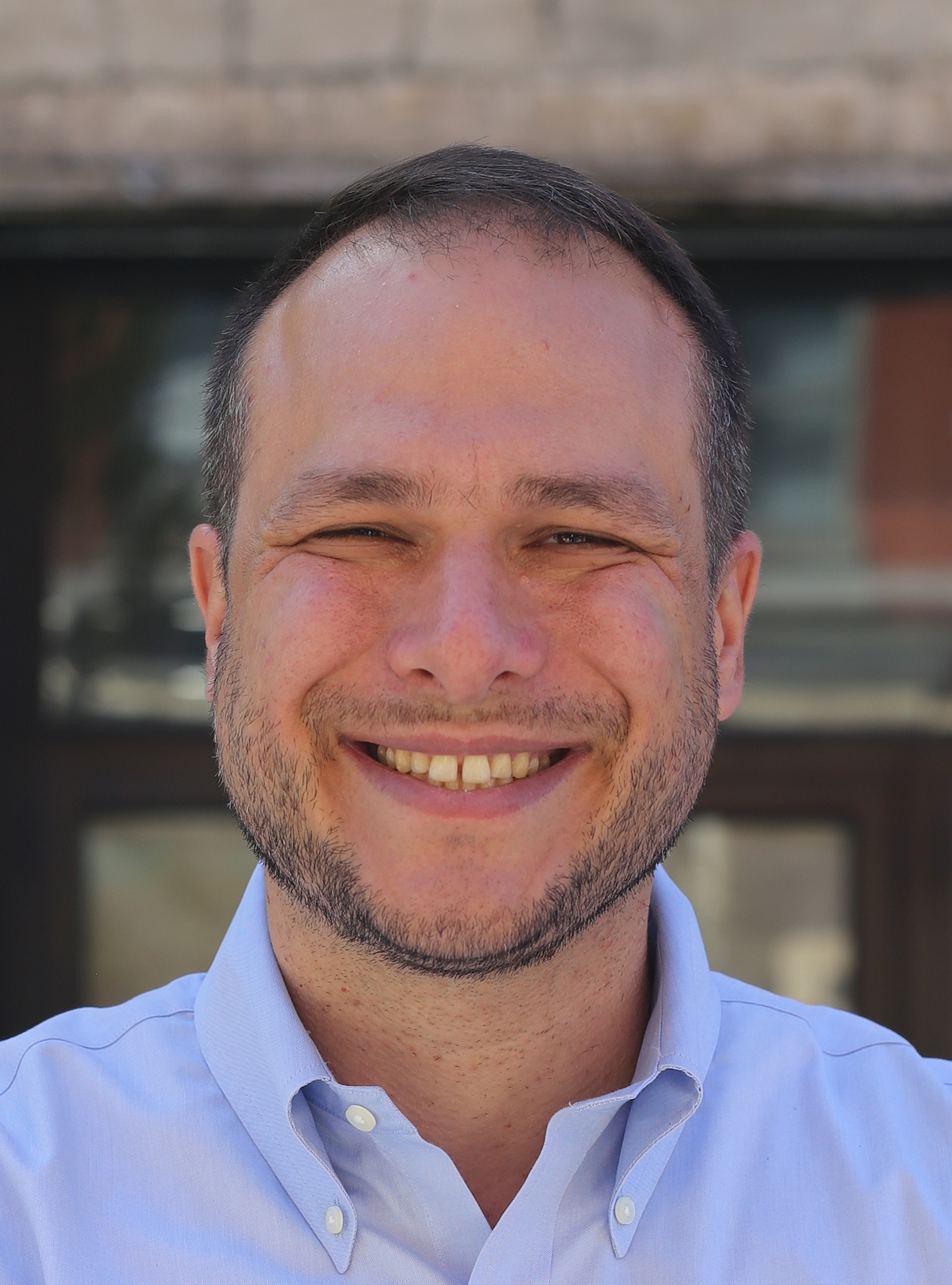

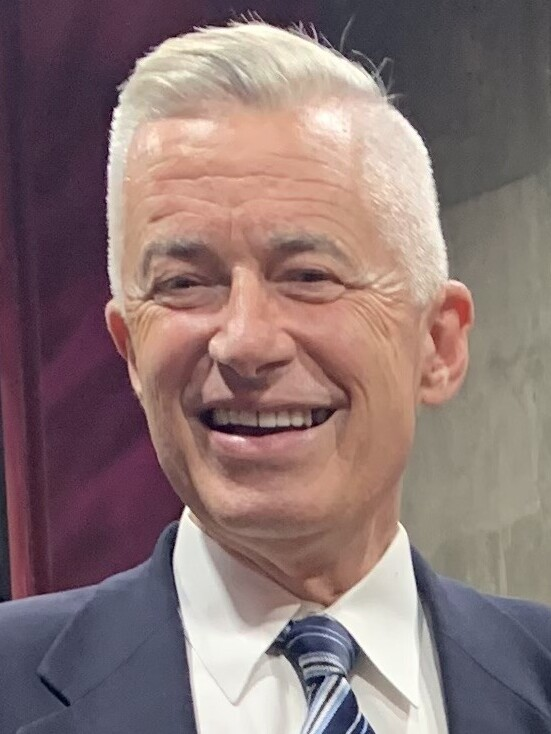

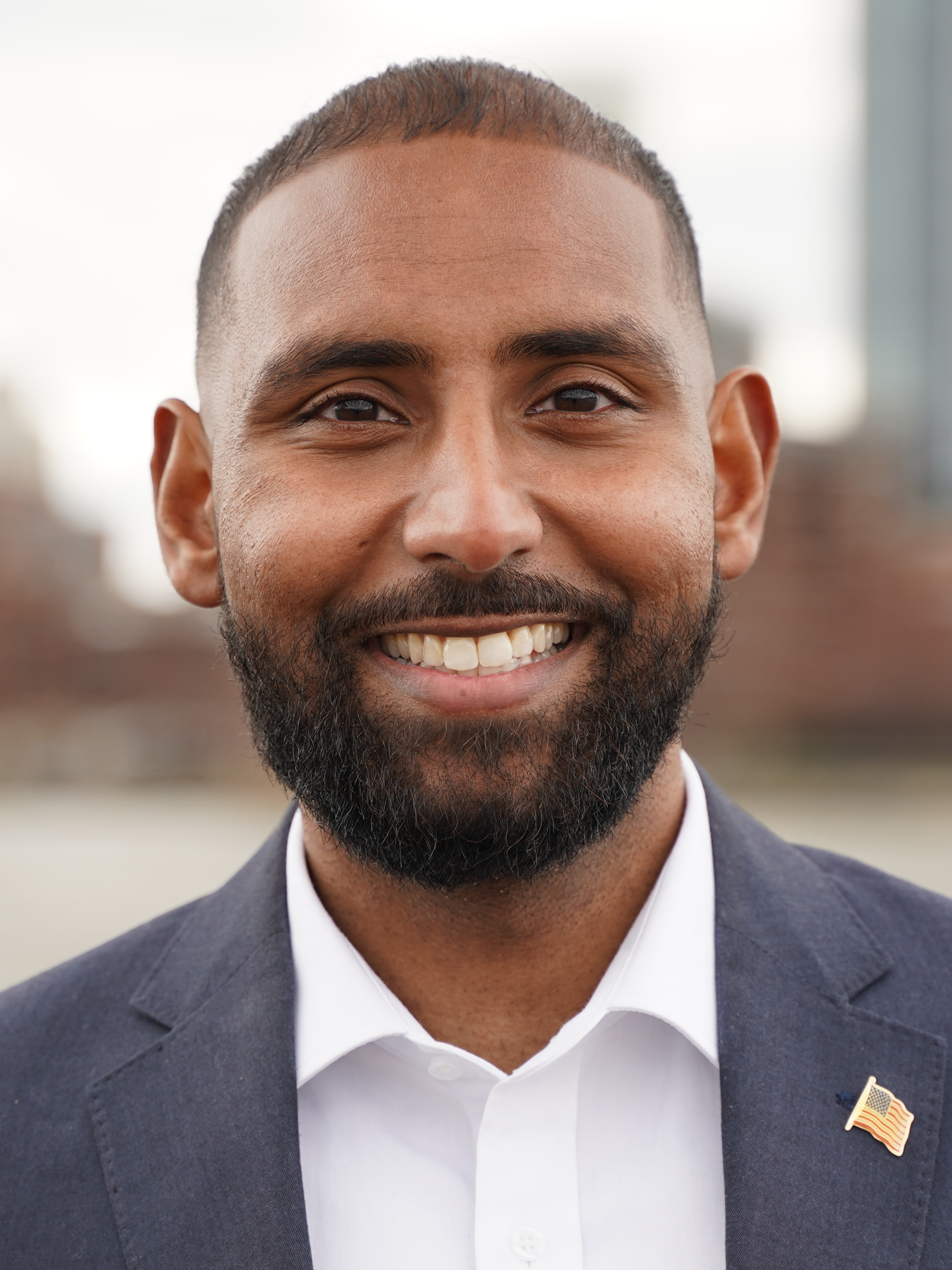
Candidate	James Solomon	Jim McGreevey
First round	18,838; 29.19%	16,219; 25.13%
Runoff	24,675; 68.16%	11,525; 31.84%
Candidate	Bill O'Dea	Mussab Ali
First round	13,844; 21.45%	11,877; 18.40%
Runoff	Eliminated	Eliminated
- Solomon: 20–30% 30–40% 40–50% 50–60% 60–70% McGreevey: 20–30% 30–40% 40–50% O'Dea: 20–30% 30–40% 40–50% Ali: 20–30% 30–40% 40–50% 50–60% No data Solomon: 30–40% 40–50% 50–60% 60–70% 70–80% 80–90% McGreevey: 10–20% 20–30% 30–40% 40–50% 50–60% 60–70% No data
Mayor before election
Steven Fulop
Democratic
Elected Mayor
James Solomon
Democratic

The 2025 Jersey City mayoral election was held on November 4, 2025. A runoff was held on December 2, 2025, between the top two candidates, as none achieved a majority of the vote in the general election. Incumbent Democratic Mayor Steven Fulop was eligible to seek re-election to a fourth four-year term, but announced he would instead run for governor.

Incumbent city councillor James Solomon was elected in a December 2 runoff, defeating former state governor Jim McGreevey.

== Candidates ==
=== Advanced to the runoff ===
- James Solomon, city councilor from ward E (2017–present)
- Jim McGreevey, former governor of New Jersey (2002–2004)

=== Eliminated in the first round ===
- Bill O’Dea, Hudson County commissioner from the 2nd district (1997–present)
- Kalki Jayne-Rose, musician
- Mussab Ali, former president of the Jersey City Board of Education (2021–2022) at-large (2018–2022)
- Christina Freeman, police officer
- Joyce Watterman, president of the Jersey City Council (2023–present) from the at-large district (2013–present)

=== Declined ===
- Steven Fulop, incumbent mayor (2013–present) (ran for governor)
- Jerry Walker, Hudson County commissioner from the 3rd district (2018–present), candidate for mayor in 2013, and candidate for New Jersey's 10th congressional district in 2024 (ran for State Assembly)

== General election ==
=== Endorsements ===
Mussab Ali

Executive branch officials

- Kal Penn, actor and former Associate Director in the White House Office of Public Engagement (2009–2011)

U.S. representatives

- Ro Khanna, CA-17 (2017–present)
- Ilhan Omar, MN-5 (2019–present)
- Rashida Tlaib, MI-12 (2019–present)

Statewide officials

- Keith Ellison, Minnesota attorney general (2019–present)

Local officials

- Svante Myrick, former mayor of Ithaca, New York (2012–2022)

Organizations

- 314 Action
- CAIR Action NJ
- Emgage Action New Jersey
- New American Leaders Action Fund
- People for the American Way
- Run for Something
Jim McGreevey

U.S. representatives

- Bonnie Watson Coleman, NJ-12 (2015–present)
- Albio Sires, NJ-8 (2006–2023) and mayor of West New York (1995–2006, 2023–present)

Statewide officials

- Phil Murphy, governor of New Jersey (2018–present)
- Ed Rendell, former governor of Pennsylvania (2003–2011)

State legislators

- Raj Mukherji, state senator from the 32nd district (2024–present)
- Nicholas Sacco, former state senator from the 32nd district (1994–2024) and mayor of North Bergen (1991–present)
- Brian Stack, state senator from the 33rd district (2008–present) and mayor of Union City (2000–present)
- Stephen Sweeney, former president of the New Jersey Senate (2010–2022) from the 3rd district (2002–2022)

County officials

- Frank Sadeghi, at-large Ocean County Commissioner (2023–present)

Local officials

- Rich Boggiano, Jersey City councilor from ward C (2013–present)
- Jerramiah Healy, former mayor of Jersey City (2004–2013)
- Gerald McCann, former mayor of Jersey City (1981–1985, 1989–1992)
- Annise Parker, former mayor of Houston (2010–2016)
- Andre Sayegh, mayor of Paterson (2018–present)
- 6 other mayors

Party officials

- George Gilmore, Ocean County Republican Party Chair (1996–2019, 2022–present)
- Craig Guy, Hudson County Democratic Party Chair (2024–present) and Hudson County Executive (2024–present)

Individuals

- John Costa, international president of Amalgamated Transit Union (2019–present)
- Harold Daggett, international president of International Longshoremen's Association (2011–present)
- Christian Fuscarino, executive director of Garden State Equality (2016–present)

Political parties

- Hudson County Democratic Organization

Labor unions

- American Federation of State, County and Municipal Employees Local 246
- Amalgamated Transit Union - National and New Jersey State Council
- Eastern Atlantic States Regional Council of Carpenters
- International Longshoremen's Association - National and New York-New Jersey District Council
- International Union of Operating Engineers Local 825
- Jersey City Police Officers Benevolent Association
- Jersey City Police Superior Officers Association
- Laborers' International Union of North America
- United Food and Commercial Workers Local 360

Organizations

- Garden State Equality Action Fund
- LGBTQ+ Victory Fund
Bill O’Dea

Local officials

- Daniel Rivera, at-large Jersey City councilor (2013–present)

Labor unions

- American Federation of State, County and Municipal Employees District 1199J and Local 245
- International Alliance of Theatrical Stage Employees Local 59
- International Brotherhood of Teamsters Joint Council 73 and Local 560
- Hudson County Building Trades
- Jersey City Education Association
- SEIU 32BJ (co-endorsement with Solomon)
James Solomon

Local officials

- Ravinder Bhalla, mayor of Hoboken (2018–present)
- Frank Gilmore, Jersey City councilor from ward F (2021–present)
- Denise Ridley Jersey City councilor from ward A (2017–present)

Individuals

- Katie Brennan, former chief of staff for the New Jersey Housing and Mortgage Finance Agency

Labor unions

- Committee of Interns and Residents
- Health Professionals and Allied Employees
- SEIU 32BJ (co-endorsement with O'Dea)

Organizations

- New Jersey Working Families Party
- Our Revolution
Joyce Watterman

Organizations

- The Collective PAC
Declined to endorse

Local officials

- Ras Baraka, mayor of Newark (2014–present)

=== Polling ===
Poll source	Date(s) administered	Sample size (Note: Key: A – all adults RV – registered voters LV – likely voters V – unclear)	Margin of error	Mussab Ali	Jim McGreevey	Bill O'Dea	James Solomon	Joyce Watterman	Other	Undecided
Public Policy Polling (D) (Note: This poll was sponsored by Solomon's campaign)	October 23, 2025	494 (LV)	± 4.4%	10%	22%	16%	24%	–	4%	24%
Swayable (Note: This poll was sponsored by Ali’s campaign)	October, 2025	397 (LV)	± 5.1%	17%	29%	10%	8%	–	7%	25%
Garin-Hart-Yang Research Group (D) (Note: This poll was sponsored by O'Dea's campaign)	August 6–9, 2025	401 (LV)	± 4.9%	3%	30%	18%	15%	7%	–	27%
Impact Research (D)	July 24–27, 2025	500 (LV)	± 4.4%	5%	27%	11%	26%	6%	3%	22%
Opiniones Latinas/ McLaughlin & Associates (Note: This poll was sponsored by McGreevey's campaign)	June 18–24, 2025	600 (LV)	–	5%	38%	12%	18%	5%	–	23%
Impact Research (D)	August 16–20, 2024	400 (LV)	± 4.9%	6%	28%	8%	16%	4%	3%	36%

=== Results ===
2025 Jersey City mayoral general election
Candidate	Votes	%
James Solomon	18,838	29.19%
Jim McGreevey	16,219	25.13%
Bill O’Dea	13,844	21.45%
Mussab Ali	11,877	18.40%
Joyce Watterman	2,491	3.86%
Christina Freeman	955	1.48%
Kalki Jayne-Rose	162	0.25%
Write-in	154	0.24%
Total votes	64,540	100.00

== Runoff ==
=== Endorsements ===
Jim McGreevey

2025 mayoral candidates

- Joyce Watterman, president of the Jersey City Council (2023–present) from the at-large district (2013–present)

Local officials

- Daniel Rivera, at-large Jersey City councilor (2013–present) (previously endorsed O'Dea)
James Solomon

2025 mayoral candidates

- Mussab Ali, former president of the Jersey City Board of Education (2021–2022) at-large (2018–2022)
- Christina Freeman, police officer
- Bill O’Dea, Hudson County commissioner from the 2nd district (1997–present)

U.S. senators

- Andy Kim, New Jersey (2025–present)
- Elizabeth Warren, Massachusetts (2013–present)

State legislators

- Angela McKnight, state senator from the 31st district (2024–present)

Local officials

- Yraida Aponte-Lipski, Hudson County commissioner from the 4th district (2021–present)
- Ras Baraka, mayor of Newark (2014–present)
- Joel Torres, former Hudson County commissioner from the 4th district (2018–2020)

Labor unions

- American Federation of State, County and Municipal Employees New Jersey Council 63
- Communications Workers of America District 1
Declined to endorse

State legislators

- Brian Stack, state senator from the 33rd district (2008–present) and mayor of Union City (2000–present) (previously endorsed McGreevey)

Local officials

- Craig Guy, Hudson County Executive (2024–present) and Hudson County Democratic Party Chair (2024–present) (previously endorsed McGreevey)

Political parties

- Hudson County Democratic Organization (previously endorsed McGreevey)

=== Polling ===
Poll source	Date(s) administered	Sample size	Margin of error	Jim McGreevey	James Solomon	Undecided
Impact Research (D)	November 6–10, 2025	500 (LV)	± 4.4%	29%	58%	13%
Impact Research (D)	July 24–27, 2025	500 (LV)	± 4.4%	38%	46%	16%

=== Results ===
2025 Jersey City mayoral runoff
Candidate	Votes	%
James Solomon	24,675	68.16%
Jim McGreevey	11,525	31.84%
Total votes	36,200	100.00

== Notes ==
Partisan clients
