= Kathryn Wylde =

American not-for-profit executive

Kathy Wylde
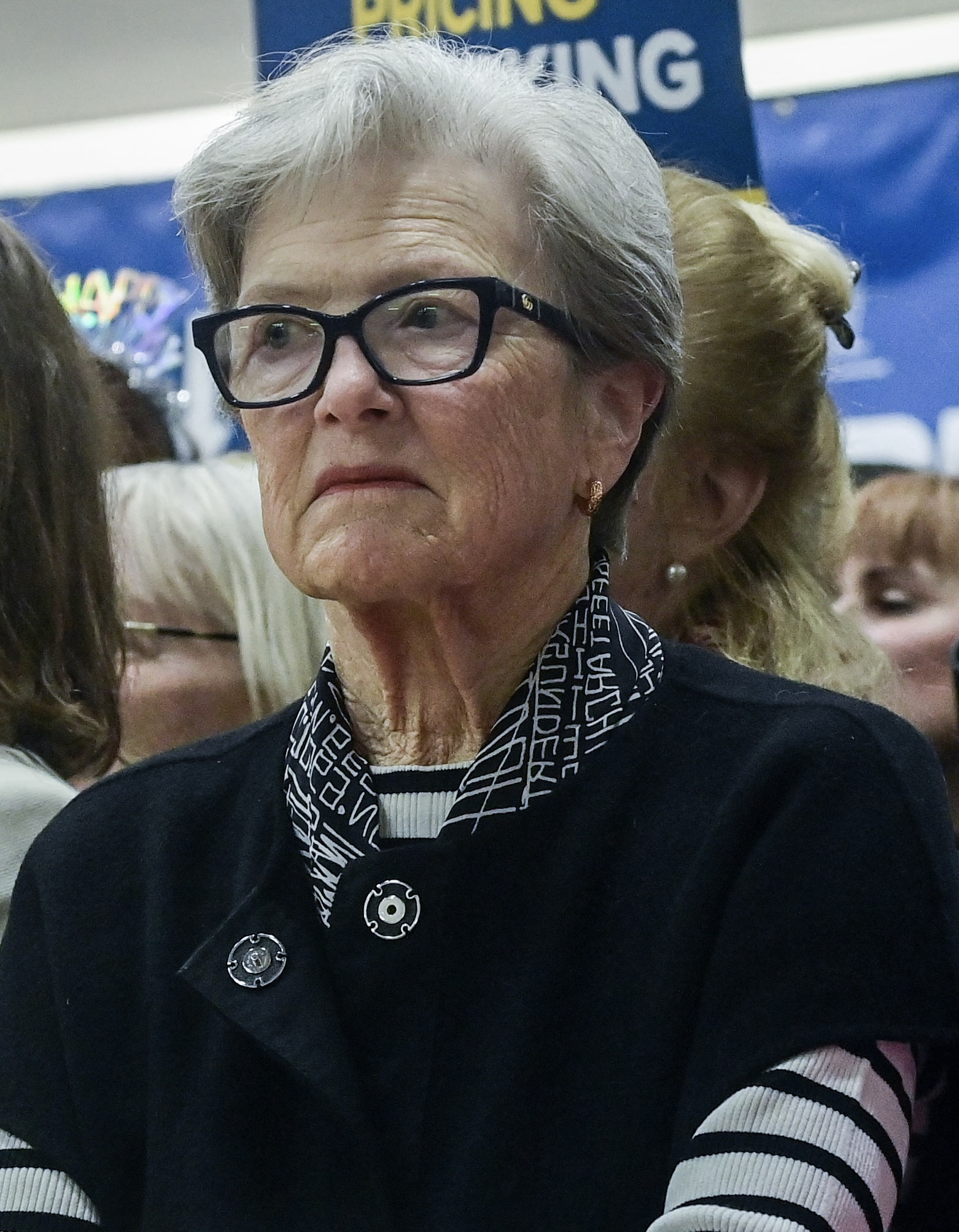
- Wylde in 2026
- Born: June 22, 1946 (age 80); Madison, Wisconsin, U.S.
- Education: Saint Olaf College (BA)
- Political party: Democratic

Kathryn Wylde (born June 22, 1946) is an American executive and the former president and CEO of the non-profit organization Partnership for New York since 2011.

In a late 2020 interview, she described herself as "the lone defender of the billionaires at this point". Pro Publica reported in 2018 that Wylde’s salary exceeded $1.1 million, which would make her among the highest paid non-profit executives in the State of New York.

== Biography ==
Wylde was born on June 22, 1946, in Madison, Wisconsin. She earned her bachelor's from St. Olaf College in 1968. Prior to becoming the leader of the Partnership, Wylde was the founding CEO of both the Partnership's housing and investment fund affiliates. She serves on a number of boards and advisory groups, such as the New York City Economic Development Corporation, the Fund for Public Schools, the conservative Manhattan Institute, Sponsors for Educational Opportunity, and the Governor's NYC Regional Economic Development Council. Wylde has also served as director of the Federal Reserve Bank of New York. In 2018, City and State magazine considered her to be the third most important person in New York City and State, after Michael Bloomberg and Stephen M. Ross. Crains New York Business listed her among the 50 most powerful women in New York City in 2017. Her Sunday routine was profiled in 2011 by The New York Times.

In 2025, New York Mayor-elect Zohran Mamdani nominated Wylde to his transition committee "Committee on Economic Development & Workforce Development".

== Views ==
The New York Times reported that Wylde was among a number of prominent New Yorkers (and one of the primary movers) authoring a follow-up letter to Amazon, asking it to reconsider its decision to not build Amazon HQ2 in New York City. Her group also paid for a follow-up ad in the Times, writing that she felt “that the handling of the Amazon HQ2 situation had tarnished NYC's reputation as a place to do business”.

In reference to New York City's proposed ‘Pied-à-Terre’ Tax on Multimillion-Dollar Second Homes, Wylde has indicated that she does not think the proposed tax will be well received by the business community, suggesting that such a tax — combined with the recent tax code change that capped the amount of local income taxes that can be deducted on federal income taxes — might push the wealthy to reconsider living in NYC. In response to Mayor Bill de Blasio’s announcement of a new paid vacation day requirement, Wylde commented: “The New York business community got no heads-up on this ‘national first’ announcement, so apparently we are not the audience being addressed, although local entrepreneurs will certainly be the victims.”

In March 2021, the Partnership wrote to then-Governor of New York Andrew Cuomo against taxing the wealthy, writing that "ultimately, these new taxes may trigger a major loss of economic activity and revenues as companies are pressured to relocate operations".
