= James Solomon (politician) =

American politician (born 1984)

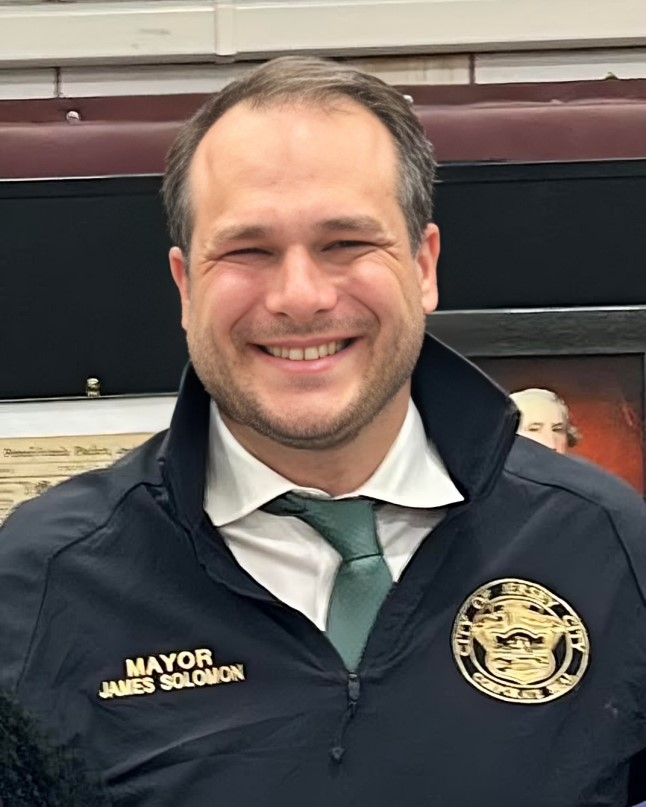
- Solomon in 2026

50th Mayor of Jersey City
- Incumbent
- Assumed office January 15, 2026
- Preceded by: Steven Fulop

Member of Jersey City Council from Ward E
- In office January 1, 2018 – January 14, 2026
- Preceded by: Candice Osborne
- Succeeded by: Eleana Little

Personal details
- Born: February 23, 1984 (age 42) Millburn, New Jersey, U.S.
- Party: Democratic
- Spouse: Gabrielle Ramos
- Children: 3
- Education: Pomona College (BA); Harvard University (MPP)

James Slater Solomon (born February 23, 1984) is an American politician and educator who is the 50th mayor of Jersey City, New Jersey since January 15, 2026. A member of the Democratic Party, he served on the Jersey City Council representing Ward E from 2018 to 2026.

Solomon won the 2025 Jersey City mayoral election in a runoff held in December 2025, defeating former New Jersey governor Jim McGreevey. He took office on January 15, 2026, succeeding Steven Fulop.

== Early life and career ==
Solomon grew up in Millburn, New Jersey, and attended Newark Academy, graduating in 2002. In 2006, he received an undergraduate degree from Pomona College, where he studied public policy analysis. He went on to obtain a master’s degree in public policy from Harvard Kennedy School. He also served as an aide to Boston mayor Thomas Menino.

Solomon moved to Jersey City in 2014. He taught government and politics at Saint Peter's University, New Jersey City University, and Hudson County Community College as an adjunct professor.

== Political career ==
=== Jersey City Council ===
In 2017, Solomon was elected to the Jersey City Council representing Ward E, which encompasses the downtown waterfront area. He was sworn into office on January 1, 2018. Solomon was re-elected in 2021 with 68.5% of the vote, a 15% increase from his initial election. During his tenure on the council, he focused on issues including affordable housing, government transparency, and public safety.

=== 2025 mayoral election ===
In 2025, Solomon announced his candidacy for mayor of Jersey City. The general election, held on November 4, 2025, featured seven candidates. Solomon and former New Jersey Governor Jim McGreevey emerged as the top two candidates, but neither secured a majority, leading to a runoff election on December 2, 2025.

Solomon's campaign emphasized making Jersey City more affordable, hiring additional police officers while establishing police oversight mechanisms, and enhancing coordination with the city's schools. He also pledged to audit tax breaks provided to developers and implement measures to cap rent increases. Solomon received endorsements from New Jersey Senator Andy Kim and Newark Mayor Ras Baraka, as well as from several candidates who had been eliminated in the first round.

In the runoff, Solomon defeated McGreevey decisively, securing approximately 68.7% of the vote. He assumed office on January 15, 2026.

== Personal life ==
Solomon is married to Gabrielle Ramos, whom he met during graduate school at Harvard. The couple have three daughters and resides in Jersey City.

In 2015, Solomon was diagnosed with Hodgkin's lymphoma. He underwent treatment and has been in remission since 2017. Solomon has stated that this experience inspired his commitment to public service.

== Electoral history ==
=== 2025 Jersey City mayoral election ===
2025 Jersey City mayoral election (November 4, 2025)
Party	Candidate	Votes	%	±%
Nonpartisan	James Solomon	17,200	29.1	−
Nonpartisan	Jim McGreevey	15,042	25.4	−
Nonpartisan	Bill O'Dea	13,844	21.5	−
Nonpartisan	Mussab Ali	11,877	18.4	−
Nonpartisan	Others	3,762	6.6	−

Note: No candidate received a majority, triggering a runoff between the top two candidates.

2025 Jersey City mayoral runoff (December 2, 2025)
Party	Candidate	Votes	%	±%
Nonpartisan	James Solomon	14,402	68.7	−
Nonpartisan	Jim McGreevey	6,821	31.3	−

== See also ==
- List of mayors of Jersey City, New Jersey
- 2025 United States elections

Political offices
Preceded by Steven Fulop	Mayor of Jersey City; 2026–present	Incumbent
