= 2013 Jersey City mayoral election =

- May 14, 2013
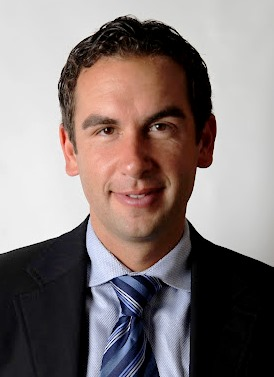

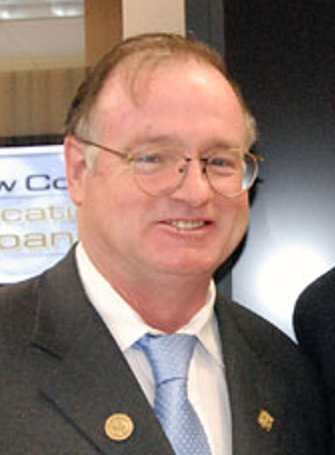

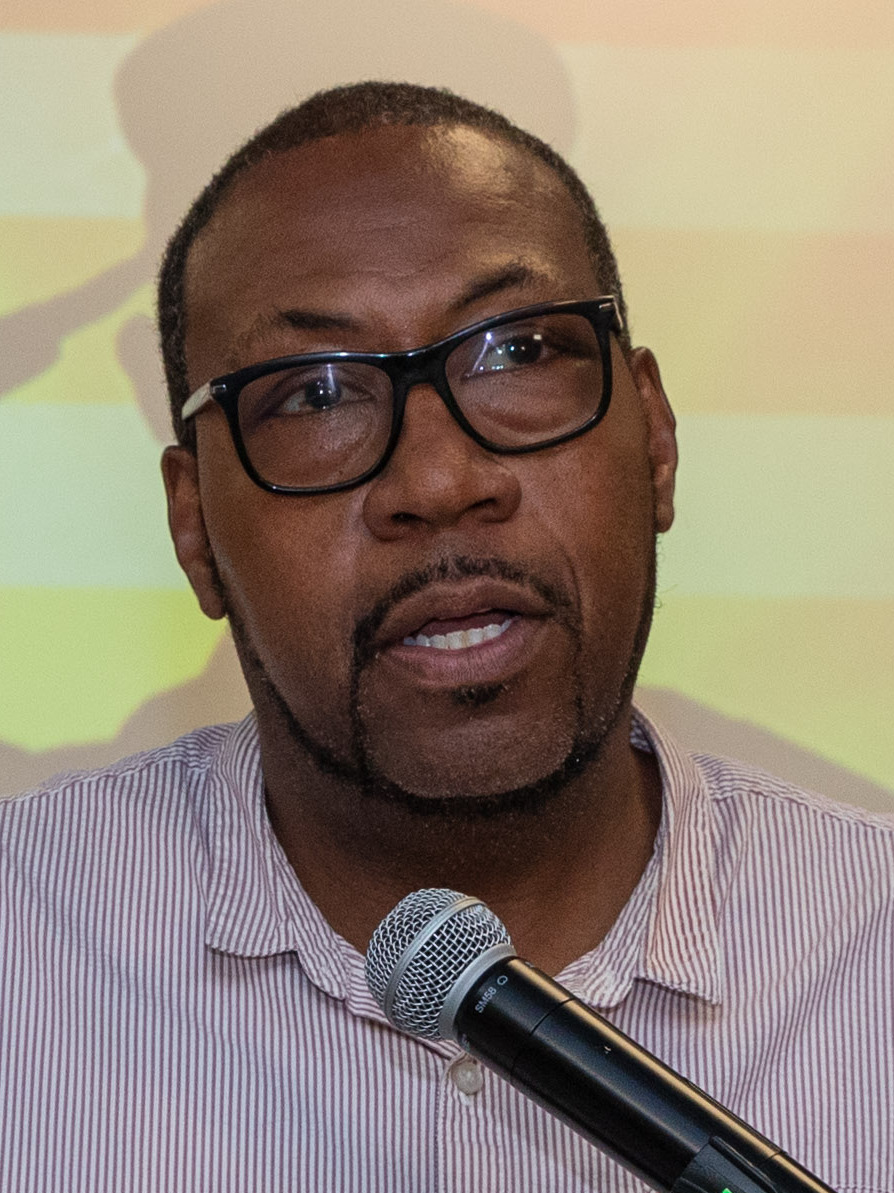
Candidate	Steve Fulop	Jerramiah Healy	Jerry Walker
Party	Democratic	Democratic	Nonpartisan
Popular vote	20,983	14,391	3,290
Percentage	52.94%	37.67%	8.30%
Mayor before election
Jerramiah Healy
Democratic
Elected mayor
Steve Fulop
Democratic

The Jersey City mayoral election of 2013 was held on May 14, 2013. Democrat Jerramiah Healy was defeated in his bid for a third full term by fellow Democrat, Ward E councilman Steve Fulop.

== Results ==
Candidate	Vote Count	Percent
Steve Fulop	20,983	52.94%
Jerramiah Healy	14,391	37.67%
Jerry Walker	3,290	8.30%
Abdul Malik	407	1.03%
Personal Choice	28	0.07%
