= 2009 Jersey City mayoral election =

- May 12, 2009
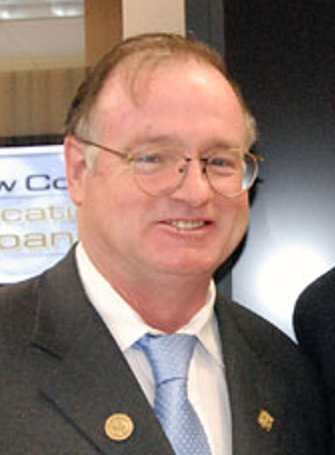
Candidate	Jerramiah Healy	Louis Manzo
Party	Independent	Independent
Popular vote	16,823	8,374
Percentage	53.0%	26.4%
Candidate	L. Harvey Smith	Dan Levin
Party	Independent	Independent
Popular vote	4,061	1,739
Percentage	12.8%	5.5%
Mayor before election
Jerramiah Healy
Independent
Elected mayor
Jerramiah Healy
Independent

The 2009 Jersey City non-partisan mayoral election occurred on May 12, 2009. Incumbent mayor Jerramiah Healy was re-elected to a second full term in office with 53 percent of the vote against four other candidates, led by his 2004 rivals Lou Manzo and L. Harvey Smith. Former mayor Bret Schundler initially sought to run but dropped out in January 2009 citing fundraising difficulties.

== Candidates ==
- Jerramiah Healy, incumbent mayor since 2004 (Democratic)
- L. Harvey Smith, state assemblyman, former acting mayor, and candidate for mayor in 2004 (Democratic)
- Dan Levin, activist (Independent)
- Louis Manzo, state assemblyman, former Hudson County freeholder, and candidate for mayor in 1992, 1993, and 2004 (Democratic)
- Philip G. Webb, minister

=== Withdrew ===
- Bret Schundler, former mayor (1992–2001) (Republican)

=== Declined ===
- Steven Fulop, member of the Jersey City Council from Ward E (Democratic)

== Results ==
Candidate	Votes	Percent
Jerramiah Healy	16,823	53.01%
Louis Manzo	8,374	26.39%
L. Harvey Smith	4,061	12.80%
Dan Levin	1,739	5.48%
Philip Webb	719	2.27%
Write-in	20	0.06%
Votes	42,357	100.00%
