= Mussab Ali =

Pakistani-American politician (born 1997)

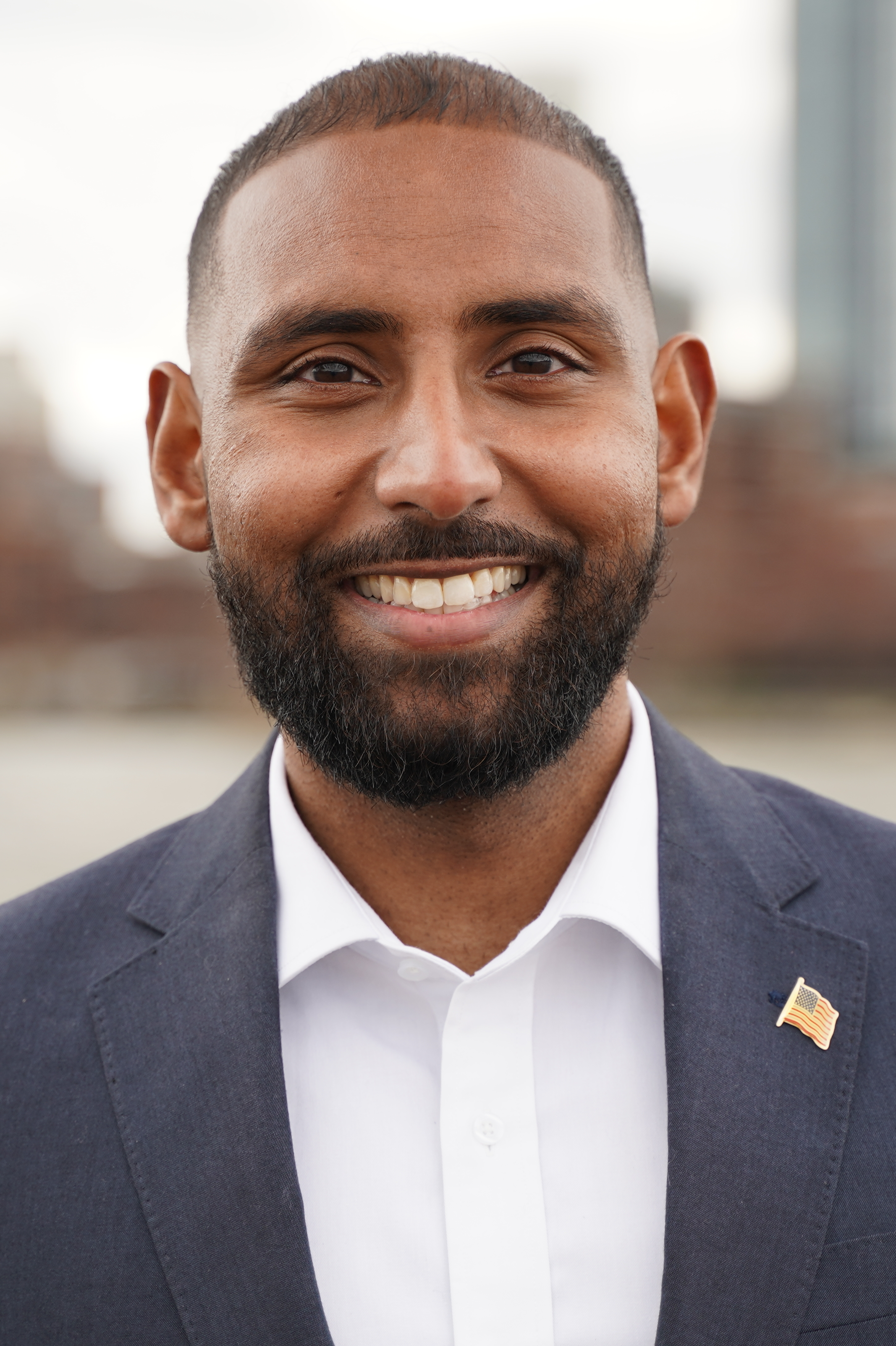
- Ali in 2025

Personal details
- Born: 1997 (age 28–29) Lahore, Pakistan
- Party: Democratic
- Education: Rutgers University, Newark (BA); Tsinghua University (MA); Harvard University (JD)
- Website: Campaign website

Mussab Ali (born 1997) is a Pakistani-American politician who served on the Jersey City Board of Education from 2018 to 2022, serving as its president from 2021 to 2022. He is a member of the Democratic Party.

Ali was first elected to the Jersey City board of education in 2017, after having previously run in 2016. Ali was an unsuccessful candidate in the 2025 Jersey City mayoral election, placing fourth in the first round. He then ran for Congress in 2026, losing to incumbent Rob Menendez Jr. in the Democratic primary in a landslide.

== Early life and education ==
Mussab Ali was born in Lahore, Pakistan, and moved with his family to Jersey City, New Jersey, in 2000. His mother taught in local schools, and his father worked as a postal worker. Ali's parents experienced discrimination, harassment, and job loss which motivated his interest in civil rights. Mussab went to the Mohandas K. Gandhi Elementary School and the Academy 1 Middle School. Ali graduated from McNair Academic High School and earned dual bachelor's degrees in economics and biology from Rutgers University in 2019, where he was named a Harry S. Truman Scholar in 2017.

He completed a master's degree in global affairs at Tsinghua University as a Schwarzman Scholar. In 2020, he enrolled at Harvard Law School and was elected co‑president of its student government while also serving on the American Bar Association's Board of Governors. In 2022, he was also awarded a Paul & Daisy Soros Fellowship for New Americans and graduated from Harvard Law School in 2023.

== Jersey City Board of Education ==
In November 2017, Ali won an at-large seat at the Jersey City Board of Education with 50.15% of the vote, winning by a 68 vote margin for a one-year unexpired term, thereby becoming the youngest elected official in Jersey City history and, at the time, the youngest Muslim elected official in America. He was endorsed by the Jersey City Education Association. He was re-elected in 2018.

In April 2021, as president of the Jersey City Board of Education, Ali publicly condemned a teacher's racist and profane remarks toward black students, calling the behavior "completely unacceptable" and supporting the student who recorded the incident.

While serving as Jersey City Board of Education president, Ali announced in March 2021 that he had been diagnosed with stage IV Hodgkin’s lymphoma and would continue working during treatment; in August 2021, he said he was in complete remission.

== 2025 Jersey City mayoral campaign ==
2025 Jersey City mayoral election first round results by precinct Solomon: 20–30%; 30–40%; 40–50%; 50–60%; 60–70%; McGreevey: 20–30%; 30–40%; 40–50%; O'Dea: 20–30%; 30–40%; 40–50%; Ali: 20–30%; 30–40%; 40–50%; 50–60%

Ali was a candidate in the 2025 Jersey City mayoral election. Ali filed paperwork with the New Jersey Election Law Enforcement Commission in April 2024 to run in the nonpartisan 2025 Jersey City mayoral election.

During the campaign, Ali emphasized affordability, public transit, and ethics reforms, including proposals to expand affordable housing, improve local bus service, and tighten anti-corruption rules. His campaign was often compared with that of Zohran Mamdani from across the Hudson River.

Ali participated in a number of forums and televised interviews, including an October 2025 NJPBS “Chat Box” program with fellow candidates James Solomon and Bill O’Dea, as well as issue-oriented events hosted by local advocacy groups. In late October, his campaign reported third-quarter fundraising of about $244,000 with roughly $250,000 cash on hand, according to filings summarized by Hudson County View.

He received support from several progressive elected officials and organizations, including endorsements from U.S. Representatives Ilhan Omar and Ro Khanna, and Minnesota Attorney General Keith Ellison. Additional institutional support included endorsements by People for the American Way, Run for Something, and New American Leaders Action Fund.

The 2025 race drew seven candidates vying to succeed outgoing mayor Steven Fulop; if no candidate won a majority on November 4, a December 2 runoff was scheduled under city rules. Ali was eliminated from the race in the November 4, 2025 general election, after coming in fourth place.

== 2026 U.S. House campaign ==
2026 Democratic primary results by precinct: Menendez: 40–50%; 50–60%; 60–70%; 70–80%; 80–90%; 90–100%; Ali: 50–60%; 60–70%; 80–90%; Ties: 40–50%; 50%

Ali ran for Congress in 2026, challenging incumbent representative Rob Menendez in the Democratic primary.

Ali lost to Menendez 31.1%–68.9%.
