= List of New Jersey administrative agencies =

The executive branch of New Jersey's state government executes state law through cabinet-level or principal departments and further by administrative agencies departments, special commissions, or independent entities as defined by statute.

== Administrative agencies and offices ==
=== Department of Agriculture ===
The state's Department of Agriculture is overseen by a Secretary of Agriculture selected by the governor on recommendation of the State Board of Agriculture. The department's mission is administered by five divisions.

- Division of Agriculture and Natural Resources
  - State Soil Conservation Committee and Soil Conservation Districts
  - Cost-Share Assistance to Farmers for Soil and Water Conservation Projects
  - Office of Aquaculture Coordination
  - Agricultural Education program
  - New Jersey Agricultural Statistics Service (NASS)
- Division of Animal Health
- Division of Food and Nutrition
- Division of Marketing and Development
- Division of Plant Industry

=== Department of Banking & Insurance ===
- Division of Banking
  - Office of Consumer Finance
  - Office of Depositories
- Division of Insurance
  - Life Bureau
  - Health Bureau
  - Valuation Bureau
  - Bureau of Fraud Deterrence
  - Office of Captive Insurance
  - Office for e-HIT
  - Office of Property and Casualty
  - Office of Solvency Regulation
- New Jersey Real Estate Commission
  - Bureau of Subdivided Land Sales Control
- Office of Public Affairs

=== Department of Children and Families ===
- Division of Family and Community Partnerships
  - Office of Early Childhood Services
  - Office of Family Support Services
  - Office of School-Linked Services
- Division on Women
- Office of Adolescent Services
- Office of Advocacy
- Office of Diversity, Equity & Belonging
- Office of Education
- Office of Licensing
- Office of Performance Management and Accountability
- Office of Strategic Development
- Child Protection and Permanency
- Children's System of Care
- Institutional Abuse Investigation Unit

=== Department of Community Affairs ===
- Division of Codes & Standards
  - Bureau of Construction Project Review
  - Bureau of Homeowner Protection
  - Bureau of Housing Inspection
  - Bureau of Rooming and Boarding House Standards
  - Bureau of State and Local Code Inspections
  - Office of the Director
  - Office of Regulatory Affairs
- Division of Disaster Recovery & Mitigation
- Division of Fire Safety
  - Bureau of Fire Code Enforcement
  - Bureau of Fire Department Services
  - Office of Fire Department Preparedness
  - Regulatory and Legislative Office
  - Office of Training & Certification
  - Arson/K-9/Fire Investigation Unit
  - Community Risk Reduction Unit
  - Contractor Certification Unit
  - NFIRS Unit
  - Inspection Unit
  - Registration Unit
  - Local Assistance Unit
  - Youth Firesetter Prevention Unit
- Division of Housing & Community Resources
  - Office of Community Services
  - Office of Energy Assistance
  - Office of Housing Assistance
  - Office of Housing Production
  - Office of Neighborhood Programs
- Division of Local Government Services
  - Local Assistance Bureau
- Office of Communications
- Office of Legislative Affairs
- Office of Local Planning Services
- Office of Information Privacy

=== Department of Corrections ===
The New Jersey Department of Corrections operates 13 major correctional or penal institutions, including seven adult male correctional facilities, three youth facilities, one facility for sex offenders, one women's correctional institution and a central reception and intake unit; and stabilization and reintegration programs for released inmates.

- New Jersey State Parole Board
- Division of Programs and Community Services
  - Office of Community Programs and Outreach Services
    - Office of County Services
    - Office of Chaplaincy Services
    - Volunteer Services
    - Office of Victim Services
  - Office of Substance Abuse Programming and Addiction Services
  - Office of Educational Services
  - Office of Transitional Services
- Division of Administration
  - Bureau of State Use Industries
  - Office of Financial Management
    - Bureau of Budget and Fiscal Planning
    - Bureau of Auditing
    - Bureau of Accounting and Revenue
    - Institutional Operations Bureau
    - Bureau of Procurement and Contract Management
  - Office of Human Resources
  - Office of Information Technology.
- Division of Operations
  - AgriIndustries
  - Capital Planning and Construction Unit
  - Central Medical/Transportation Unit and Central Communications
  - Classification support and Training/Auditing Units
  - Field Services Units
  - Health Services Unit
  - Immigration Services, Parole Monitoring and the Office of Interstate Services
  - Release Notification Unit (Central Office)
  - Special Operations Group
    - Special Operations Response Team (SORT)
    - Canine Unit
    - Correctional Emergency Response Team (CERT)
    - Departmental Firearms Unit
    - Critical Incident Negotiation Team (CINT)
    - Enhanced Security Transportation Unit
    - Community Labor Assistance Program

=== Department of Education ===
- Division of Teaching and Learning Services
- Division of Educational Services
- Division of Field Support and Services
- Division of Early Childhood Services
- Division of Administrative Services
- Division of Legal and External Services
- Marie H. Katzenbach School for the Deaf
- Office of Assessments
- Office of Budget and Accounting
- Office of Career Readiness
- Office of Certification/Induction
- Office of Charter & Renaissance Schools
- Office of Commissions
- Office of Communications
- Office of Comprehensive Support
- Office of Controversies and Disputes
- Office of District Intervention & Support
- Office of Equal Employment Opportunity/Affirmative Action
- Office of Field Services Coordination
- Office of Fiscal Accountability and Compliance
- Office of Fiscal and Data Services
- Office of Fiscal Policy and Planning
- Office of Grants Management
- Office of Human Capital Resources
- Office of Human Capital Resources
- Office of Information Technology
- Office of Interdistrict Choice and Nonpublic Schools
- Office of K-3 Education
- Office of Legislative Affairs/Policy Development
- Office of Monitors
- Office of Performance Management
- Office of Preschool Education
- Office of Professional Learning
- Office of Recruitment and Preparation
- Office of School Ethics and Compliance
- Office of School Facility Planning
- Office of School Facility Projects
- Office of School Finance
- Office of Special Education
- Office of Special Education Policy & Dispute Resolution
- Office of Standards
- Office of STEM
- Office of Student Support Services
- Office of Supplemental Educational Programs

=== Department of Environmental Protection ===
- Division of Parks and Forestry
  - New Jersey Forest Fire Service

=== Department of Human Services ===
- Division of Aging Services
- Division of the Deaf & Hard of Hearing
- Division of Developmental Disabilities
- Division of Disability Services
- Division of Family Development
- Division of Medical Assistance & Health Services
- Division of Mental Health & Addiction Services
- Office of Auditing
- Office of Legal and Regulatory Affairs
- Office of New Americans
- Office for Prevention of Developmental Disabilities
- Office of Program Integrity & Accountability
- Office of Contract Policy & Management

=== Department of Law and Public Safety ===
The New Jersey Attorney General leads the New Jersey Department of Law and Public Safety.

- Division of Alcoholic Beverage Control
- Division on Civil Rights
- Division of Consumer Affairs
- Division of Criminal Justice
- Division of Gaming Enforcement
- Division of Highway Traffic Safety
- Division of Law
- Juvenile Justice Commission
- Racing Commission
- State Athletic Control Board
- Division of State Police
- Victims of Crime Compensation Office

=== Department of Military Affairs ===
- New Jersey National Guard
  - New Jersey Army National Guard
  - New Jersey Air National Guard
- Division of Community Relations
- Division of Military/Family Support
- Fiscal Division
- Administrative Services Division
- Information Technology Division
- Human Resources Division
- US Property & Fiscal Office
- Construction & Facilities Management Office
- Environmental Management Bureau

=== Department of Transportation ===
Executive Offices

- Commissioner
  - (Office of) Smart Growth
  - (Office of) the Inspector General
  - Chief of Staff
  - Deputy Commissioner
- Other Offices and Divisions

The following are under the Deputy Commissioner.

- Assistant Commissioner of Capital Investment Planning and Grant Administration
  - Division of Statewide Planning
    - Office of Statewide Strategies
    - Office of Systems Planning
    - Office of Research
    - Office of Commuter Mobility
    - Office of Transportation Sustainable Communities
  - Division of Multimodal Services
  - Division of Local Aid and Economic Development
  - Division of Environmental Resources
  - Division of Capital Investment Planning and Development
  - Transportation Data and Safety
- Assistant Commissioner of Capital Program Management (State Transportation Engineer)
  - Division of Highway and Traffic Design
  - Division of Right of Way and Access Management
  - Division of Capital Program Support
  - Division of Project Management
  - Division of Bridge Engineering and Infrastructure Management
  - Division of Construction Services and Materials
- Assistant Commissioner of Operations
  - Division of Operations North
  - Division of Operations Central
  - Division of Operations South
  - (Deputy Executive) Division of Operations
  - Permits, Electrical, and Claims Unit
- Assistant Commissioner of Administration
  - Division of Human Resources
  - Division of Support Services
  - Division of Civil Rights and Affirmative Action
- Divisions under the chief financial officer
  - Division of Budget
  - Division of Accounting and Auditing
  - Division of Procurement
  - Division of Information Technology
- Assistant Commissioner of Transportation Systems Management
  - Division of Traffic Operations
  - Division of Mobility and Systems Engineering
- Division (at the assistant-commissioner level) of Government and Community Relations
  - Community and Constituent Relations
  - Communications
  - Division of Legislative, Administrative, and Regulatory Actions
- Legal Services

=== Department of Treasury ===
The Department of the Treasury seeks to ensure the most beneficial use of fiscal resources and revenues to meet critical needs, all within a policy framework set by the governor; to formulate and manage the state's budget, generate and collect revenues, disburse the appropriations used to operate New Jersey state government, manage the state's physical and financial assets, and provide statewide support services to state and local government agencies. Its mission is accomplished by the following Divisions and Agencies:

- Divisions
  - Division of Administration
  - Division of Investment
  - Office of the Chief Economist/Office of Revenue and Economic Analysis (OREA)
  - Office of Management and Budget (OMB)
  - New Jersey Lottery
  - Division of Pensions and Benefits
  - Division of Property Management and Construction (DPMC)
  - Public Contracts Equal Employment Opportunity Compliance Monitoring Program
  - Division of Public Finance
  - Division of Purchase and Property
  - Division of Revenue and Enterprise Services (DORES)
  - Division of Risk Management
  - Division of Taxation
- Agencies
  - Board of Public Utilities (BPU)
  - Casino Control Commission (CCC)
  - Division of Rate Counsel
  - New Jersey Economic Development Authority
  - New Jersey Building Authority (NJBA)
  - New Jersey Public Broadcasting Authority
  - Office of Administrative Law (OAL)
  - Office of Information Technology (OIT)
  - Office of the Public Defender (OPD)
  - State Capitol Joint Management Commission (SCJMC)
  - State House Commission
  - Unclaimed Property Administration

=== Department of Veterans Affairs ===
- Division of Veterans Services
- Division of Veterans Healthcare
- Division of Community Relations
- Division of Employee Relations and Human Services
- Division of Facilities Management
- Fiscal Division
- Administrative Services Division
- Division of Information Services

=== Independent commissions and agencies ===
- New Jersey Advisory Committee on Police Standards
- New Jersey Commission on Brain Injury Research
- New Jersey Clean Air Council
- New Jersey Commission on Cancer Research
- New Jersey Commission on Higher Education
- New Jersey Commission on Science and Technology
- New Jersey Council on Local Mandates
- Delaware River Basin Commission
- New Jersey Division of Alcoholic Beverage Control
- New Jersey Election Law Enforcement Commission (Campaign and Lobbying Disclosure)
- New Jersey Emergency Management Agency
- New Jersey Energy Master Plan Agency
- Fort Monmouth Economic Revitalization Authority (FMERA)
- Garden State Preservation Trust
- New Jersey Governor's Council on Alcoholism and Drug Abuse
- Higher Education Student Assistance Authority
- New Jersey Highlands Council
- New Jersey Historic Trust (NJHT)
- New Jersey Homeland Security
- New Jersey Housing and Mortgage Finance Agency
- New Jersey Housing Resource Center (NJHRC)
- New Jersey Inspector General
- New Jersey Interstate Environmental Commission
- New Jersey Motor Vehicle Commission
- New Jersey Educational Facilities Authority (NJEFA)
- New Jersey Environmental Infrastructure Trust
- New Jersey Health Care Facilities Financing Authority (NJHCFFA)
- New Jersey Meadowlands Commission
- New Jersey Real Estate Commission
- New Jersey Redevelopment Authority (NJRA)
- New Jersey Schools Construction Corporation
- New Jersey Transit
- New Jersey Pinelands Commission
- New Jersey Pinelands Development Credit Bank
- New Jersey Professional Boards and Advisory Committees
- New Jersey Public Employment Relations Commission
- New Jersey Commission on Spinal Cord Research
- New Jersey State Casino Reinvestment Development Authority
- New Jersey State Commission of Investigation
- New Jersey State Employment and Training Commission
- New Jersey State Ethics Commission
- New Jersey State Library
- New Jersey State Police
- New Jersey Turnpike Authority
- New Jersey Victims of Crime Compensation Board
- New Jersey Waterfront Commission of New York Harbor
