= Partnership for New York City =

Nonprofit organization

- Formation: 1979; 47 years ago
- Founder: David Rockefeller
- Type: Business advocacy
- Legal status: 501(c)(6)
- Key people: Steven Fulop (President)
- Revenue: $11,472,775 (2023)
- Expenses: $8,195,076 (2023)
- Website: pfnyc.org
- Formerly called: New York City Partnership

The Partnership for New York City, formerly called the New York City Partnership, is a nonprofit business advocacy group consisting of roughly three hundred CEOs ("Partners") from prominent corporate, investment and entrepreneurial firms in New York. The organization was founded by David Rockefeller in 1979, with the aim of increasing business involvement in city government and the civic sector. It merged with the New York Chamber of Commerce and Industry in 2002, forming the current organization.

The partnership focuses on research, policy formulation and issue advocacy at the city, state and federal levels. Through its affiliate, the Partnership Fund for New York City, the partnership invests in economic development projects across the city. By 2000, the fund had raised in excess of $110 million and made more than 40 investments in businesses and nonprofits.

In 2014, the partnership was named by Crain's New York Business as New York City's most-connected nonprofit. The current president of the Partnership is former Jersey City mayor Steven Fulop.

Brad Hoylman-Sigal, now the borough president of Manhattan, formerly served as the partnership's general counsel.

== See also ==
- Greater New York Chamber of Commerce
