= 2005 Jersey City mayoral election =

- May 10, 2005
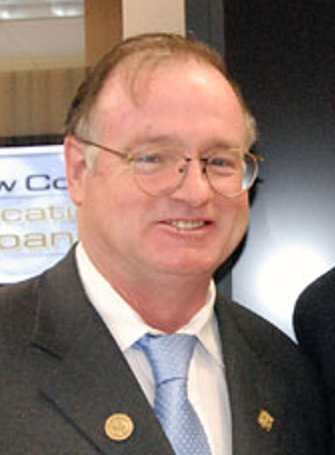

| Candidate | Jerramiah Healy | Melissa Holloway | Alfred Marc Pine |
| Party | Independent | Independent | Independent |
| Popular vote | 18,329 | 4,638 | 1,420 |
| Percentage | 75.1% | 19.0% | 5.8% |
Mayor before election
Jerramiah Healy
Democratic
Elected mayor
Jerramiah Healy
Democratic

The Jersey City mayoral election of 2005 was held on May 10, 2005. Jerramiah Healy was re-elected to a full term in office following his victory in the special election six months earlier.

== Results ==
Jersey City Mayor Completed Precincts: 176 of 184 (95.65%)

| Candidate | Vote Count | Percent |
|---|---|---|
| Jerramiah Healy | 18,329 | 75.08% |
| Melissa Holloway | 4,638 | 19.00% |
| Alfred Marc Pine | 1,420 | 5.82% |
| Personal Choice | 27 | 0.11% |
