= Jersey City Council =

Local government body in Jersey City, New Jersey

City Council of Jersey City

Type
- Type: Unicameral

Leadership
- City Council President: Council President Denise Ridley
- City Council President Pro Tempore: Council President Pro Tempore Frank Gilmore
- Seats: 9

Elections
- Voting system: Two-round system

Meeting place
- Jersey City Hall

Website
- Official website

The Jersey City Council serves is a local government body in Jersey City, New Jersey.

== Description ==
Jersey City Council serves as the legislative body for Jersey City, and consists of nine members. It consists of six ward-based districts and three at-large districts. The city operates under a mayor-council system of local governance. The members of the City Council vote among themselves to select one member to serve as the City Council President every two years.

Every four years, a city-wide election is held to elect the members of the city council. All city council elections are non-partisan, with a runoff scheduled for races in which no candidate has received a majority of the votes.

== Current membership ==
The current members of the city council are:

Ward	Name	Took Office	Preceded by
A	Denise Ridley †	2018	Francis "Frank" Gajewski
B	Joel A. Brooks	2026	Mira Prinz-Arey
C	Thomas Zuppa Jr.	2026	Richard Boggiano
D	Jake Ephros	2026	Yousef Saleh
E	Eleana Little	2026	James Solomon
F	Frank Gilmore ‡	2022	Jermaine Robinson
At-Large	Mamta Singh	2026	Daniel Rivera
At-Large	Michael O. Griffin	2026	Joyce Watterman
At-Large	Rolando R. Lavarro Jr.	2026	Amy DeGise

† Signifies City Council President

‡ Signifies City Council President Pro Tempore

== 2021 City Council ==
Ward	Name	Took Office	Preceded by
A	Denise Ridley	2018	Francis "Frank" Gajewski
B	Mira Prinz-Arey	2018	Khemraj "Chico" Ramchal
C	Richard Boggiano	2014	Nidia R. Lopez
D	Yousef Saleh	2022	Michael Yun
E	James Solomon	2022	Candice Osbourne
F	Frank Gilmore	2022	Jermaine Robinson
At-Large	Daniel Rivera	2014	Peter Brennan
At-Large	Joyce Watterman	2014	Viola S. Richardson
At-Large	Amy DeGise	2018	Rolando R. Lavarro Jr.

== Past presidents ==
- Joyce Watterman (2019-2024)
- Rolando R. Lavarro Jr. (2013-2019)
- Peter Brennan (2009-2013)
- Mariano Vega (2005-2009)
- Joseph Rakowski (1992)
- Marilyn Roman (1990-1992)
- Bobby Jackson (1981-1985)
- Dominick J. Pugliese (1973-1977)
- Thomas M. Flaherty (1971)

== See also ==
- Mayor of Jersey City
- 2025 Jersey City Mayoral Election
- 2021 Jersey City Mayoral Election
