= New Jersey Real Estate Commission =

American state agency

Commission overview
- Formed: 1921
- Jurisdiction: Government of New Jersey
- Headquarters: 20 West State Street, Trenton, New Jersey
- Commission executive: Jairo Rodriguez, Executive Director
- Parent department: New Jersey Department of Banking and Insurance
- Website: www.nj.gov/dobi/division_rec/

The New Jersey Real Estate Commission (NJREC) is the state agency responsible for licensing and regulating real estate brokers, salespersons, and related professionals in the U.S. state of New Jersey. It was established in 1921 to administer and enforce New Jersey’s real estate licensing law (known as the New Jersey Real Estate License Act, N.J.S.A. 45:15-1 et seq.) and to protect the public from dishonest practices in the real estate industry. The Commission operates as a division of the New Jersey Department of Banking and Insurance and has broad authority to issue licenses, set education and practice standards, investigate complaints, and discipline licensees who violate state real estate laws or regulations. The Commission also administers special programs such as the Real Estate Guaranty Fund (to compensate victims of fraud by licensees) and oversees the regulation of out-of-state property sales and timeshares marketed in New Jersey.

== History ==
New Jersey’s first real estate licensing law was enacted in 1921 amid nationwide efforts to professionalize the real estate business. The legislation, titled “An act to define, regulate and license real estate brokers and salesmen, to create a State Real Estate Commission and to provide penalties for the violation of the provisions hereof,” was approved on April 5, 1921 (P.L.1921, c.141). This law established the New Jersey Real Estate Commission as the regulatory authority to oversee real estate brokers and sales agents in the state. The Commission was originally placed within the Department of Insurance under the executive branch, and it was continued and affirmed by subsequent amendments in 1929 and later years. In 1948, for example, the Commission’s placement in the state government was reaffirmed, and in 1977 the statutes were updated to formalize appointment procedures under New Jersey’s uniform board governance laws.

Over time, the Commission’s mandate expanded through additional legislation. In 1976, New Jersey created the Real Estate Guaranty Fund (P.L.1976, c.112) under the Commission’s administration to protect consumers – this fund reimburses people who incur losses due to embezzlement, fraud or misappropriation by licensed real estate brokers or salespersons.

Another major expansion came with the Real Estate Sales Full Disclosure Act (N.J.S.A. 45:15-16.27 et seq.), enacted in the late 20th century to regulate the sale in New Jersey of subdivided lands, condominiums, timeshares and other real estate offerings located outside the state. In 2006, the Commission’s authority was further extended to include oversight of timeshare offerings through the New Jersey Real Estate Timeshare Act (N.J.S.A. 45:15-16.50 et seq.).

In recent years, New Jersey has updated its real estate laws to strengthen consumer protection and modernize industry practices. Notably, in 2018 a law was passed that restructured the licensing category for referral agents, requiring anyone practicing solely to refer clients to be licensed as a “salesperson licensed with a real estate referral company” (SLWRERC) and affiliated with a referral-only brokerage.

In 2024, Governor Phil Murphy signed into law the Real Estate Consumer Protection Enhancement Act (P.L.2024, c.32), a sweeping update to the Real Estate License Act aimed at improving transparency for buyers and sellers. Effective August 1, 2024, this law mandates written brokerage agreements with clients, clearer disclosure of agency relationships and compensation, a standardized property condition disclosure statement that sellers must provide to buyers, prominent agency disclosure signage at open houses, and additional continuing education requirements for licensees (including mandatory training in agency law).

== Organization and composition ==
The New Jersey Real Estate Commission is composed of eight members, as specified by state law. Of these, five members must be licensed real estate brokers who have at least 10 years’ experience in New Jersey, and two are public members (representing the interest of the general public). The eighth member is a representative of a state governmental department, traditionally an official from within the Department of Banking and Insurance or its predecessor agency. All seven non-governmental commissioners are appointed by the Governor of New Jersey and confirmed as required, serving staggered terms of three years (the government department representative serves at the pleasure of the Governor). By statute, at least a majority of the Commission’s members constitute a quorum for conducting business.

The Commission elects a President (often one of the broker members) to chair meetings, and it employs a professional staff to carry out day-to-day operations. The Commission’s executive officer, titled the Executive Director, oversees administrative functions; as of 2025, the Executive Director is Jairo Rodríguez. The Commission is organized as a division within the Department of Banking and Insurance (DOBI). Within DOBI, it falls under the Banking Division for administrative purposes, reflecting the historical placement of the real estate licensing function alongside financial and professional licensing agencies. The Commission’s offices are located in Trenton, and it holds regular public meetings (approximately 36 meetings per year) in accordance with New Jersey’s Open Public Meetings Act.

== Powers and responsibilities ==
Licensing and education: The Commission oversees the licensing of real estate brokers, broker-salespersons, salespersons, and real estate schools and instructors. It establishes the qualifications for licensure – including educational coursework, examination, and standards of good character – as set forth in the Real Estate License Act and related regulations. All applicants must complete required pre-licensing education (such as 75 hours for salesperson and additional broker courses) and pass a state examination under the Commission’s supervision. The Commission prescribes the content of pre-licensure curricula and approves real estate schooling providers and instructors. It also mandates continuing education: as of the 2010s, all licensed brokers and salespersons must earn 12 hours of continuing education credits every two years (including core topics like ethics and legal updates) as a condition of renewal, with the Commission accrediting courses and providers.

Rulemaking and standards of practice: The Commission has authority to promulgate regulations (codified in N.J.A.C. 11:5) to implement the statutes and to set professional standards. These rules cover matters such as brokers’ supervision of their agents, handling of escrow monies, record-keeping, advertising, agency disclosures, and ethical practices. The Commission periodically updates regulations and issues bulletins or guidance to clarify regulatory requirements for the industry.

Enforcement and disciplinary action: Acting in a quasi-judicial capacity, the Commission investigates complaints and enforces compliance with the real estate laws and regulations. It has the power to hold administrative hearings and to impose disciplinary sanctions on licensees who are found guilty of violations. Penalties can include license suspension or revocation, probationary periods, and monetary fines. Certain serious violations defined in N.J.S.A. 45:15-17 – such as fraud, criminal convictions involving moral turpitude (e.g. theft or forgery), making substantial misrepresentations in a transaction, commingling clients’ escrow funds, or obtaining a license by deception – can result in the most severe penalties, including permanent revocation of one’s license and fines up to $50,000 per offense.

Administration of special laws: In addition to the core licensing act, the Commission administers the Real Estate Sales Full Disclosure Act and the Real Estate Timeshare Act. It also manages the Real Estate Guaranty Fund, a consumer recovery account.
