= Jerramiah Healy =

48th mayor of Jersey City from 2004 to 2013

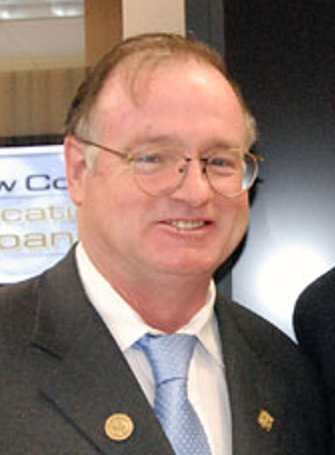

48th Mayor of Jersey City
- In office November 12, 2004 – June 30, 2013
- Preceded by: L. Harvey Smith
- Succeeded by: Steven Fulop

Personal details
- Born: Jerramiah T. Healy; December 16, 1950 (age 75)
- Party: Democratic
- Spouse: Maureen Connelly
- Children: 4
- Education: Villanova University; Seton Hall University School of Law

Jerramiah T. Healy (born December 16, 1950) is an American local politician who served as the 48th mayor of Jersey City, New Jersey serving from 2004 to 2013. He ran for the unexpired term of the late Glenn D. Cunningham and was elected in November 2004. In the special election, he defeated Acting Mayor L. Harvey Smith. He was subsequently elected to a full term by a record landslide.

Healy entered public service as an assistant prosecutor for the Hudson County Prosecutor's Office in 1977. From 1981 to 1991, he maintained a private law practice in Jersey City. He was appointed Chief Judge in the Jersey City Municipal Court in 1991, and was reappointed in 1995. In 1997, he ran unsuccessfully for Mayor of Jersey City against Bret Schundler, who later ran for Governor of New Jersey against Jim McGreevey. Healy resumed his private law practice until 2004, when he was elected mayor. Healy lost to Councilman Steven Fulop for mayor in 2013.

== Early life ==
Jerramiah Healy was the fourth of five children born to Daniel and Catherine Healy, Irish immigrants who met and married in Jersey City. His father died when Healy was five years old. Healy was raised in North Bergen and Union City, New Jersey. He attended St. Michael's Grammar School in Union City and Xavier High School in New York City and is a 1972 graduate of Villanova University. Healy then attended Seton Hall University School of Law and supported himself as a bartender and an ironworker.

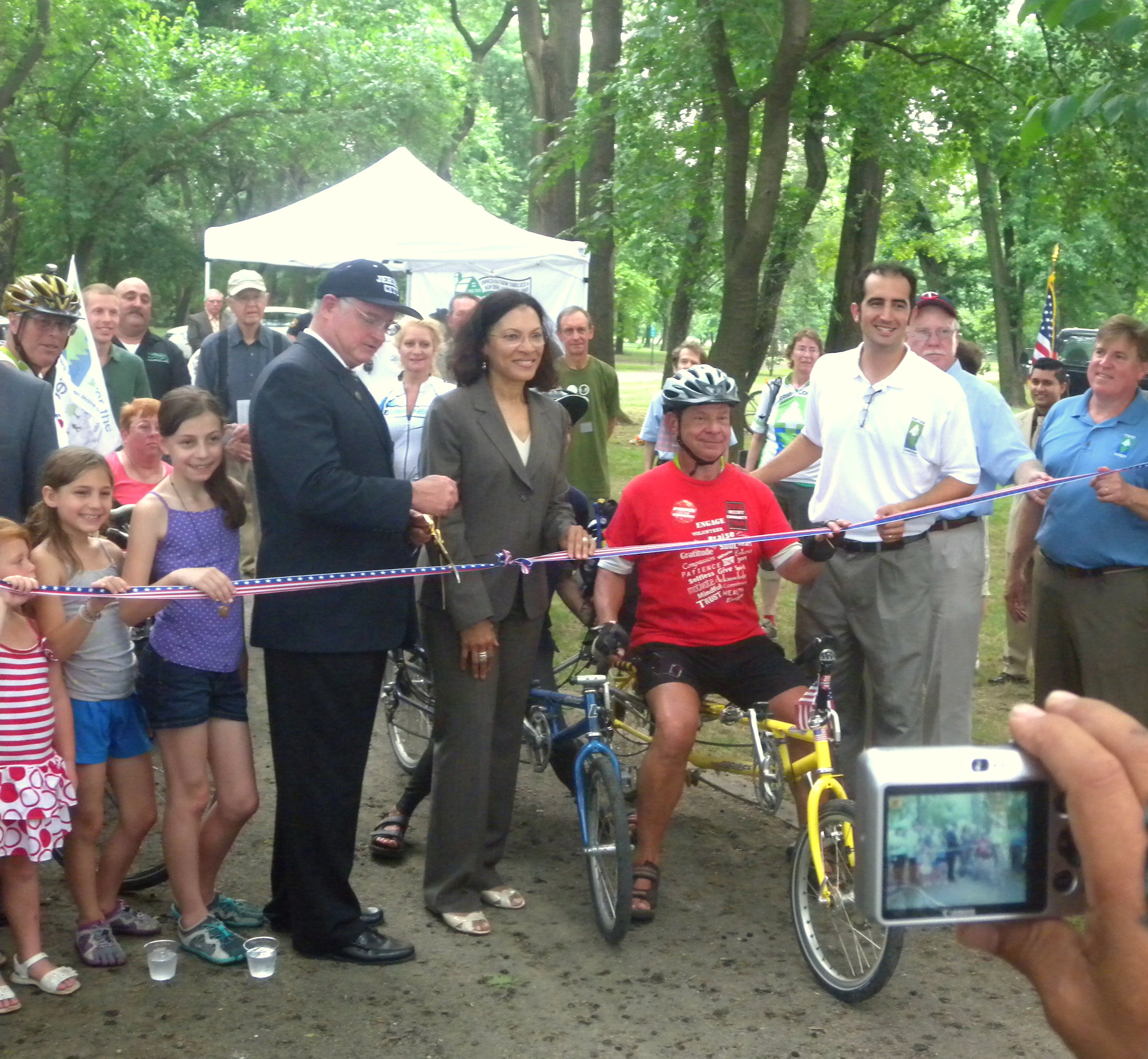
Inaugurating a segment of East Coast Greenway in Lincoln Park

== Electoral history ==
The sudden death of Mayor Glenn Cunningham in May 2004 triggered a special election. Among the eleven candidates, Jerramiah Healy won Cunningham's unexpired term with 17,401 votes (27.8%) out of 62,641 cast. Other than the unusually high number of candidates, the election was notable for the rabidly negative nature of the campaign. The attacks included the distribution of a photo taken of Jerramiah Healy on his porch in Jersey City, passed out and naked.

Healy stood for re-election in May 2005, facing only token opposition from Melissa Holloway, a former city councilperson, and Alfred Marc Pine, who had received less than one percent of the votes in the special election. Healy received 18,349 (75%) of the 24,414 votes cast.

Healy sought re-election in 2009, running as an agent of change and promoting his record of putting extra police on the street and reducing violent crime in Jersey City. His critics challenged his claims during the campaign. Nevertheless, on May 12, 2009, Healy was re-elected with nearly 53% of the vote; former New Jersey General Assemblyman Louis Manzo was the runner-up with 26%. Six of Healy's nine running mates for city council won outright on election day, two faced runoffs on June 9 and one lost to incumbent Steven Fulop in Ward E.

Healy lost his bid for another term as mayor on May 14, 2013 to Councilman Steven Fulop. In April 2025, Healy's daughter Catherine Healy announced that she would run for Jersey City Council in Ward D, under a slate headed by mayoral candidate Jim McGreevey, the former governor of New Jersey. Healey lost in a runoff election.

== Arrest and conviction ==
Healy claimed to have been "roughed up", maced, and arrested outside his sister's bar in Bradley Beach in 2006. Cops allege he was interfering in a police investigation. Healy claimed that he was attempting to intervene in an argument between a couple outside the bar. His claims were rejected by the court and he was found guilty of obstruction of justice on June 22, 2007. Healy appealed the decision while trying to portray himself as having broad public support. On July 2, 2008, Healy's appeal was denied by the state appellate court which upheld Healy's conviction. During his appeal, it was revealed that Healy had attempted to influence the arresting officers. Healy filed suit against the officers in question, alleging that they violated his right to free speech (the case was ultimately denied). Healy appealed to the State Supreme Court and was again denied.

Healy had a similar charge reduced to violation of a noise ordinance on a guilty plea in August 1999.

== Gun legislation advocate ==
He is a member of the Mayors Against Illegal Guns Coalition, a bi-partisan group with a stated goal of "making the public safer by getting illegal guns off the streets." The Coalition is co-chaired by former Boston Mayor Thomas Menino and former New York City Mayor Michael Bloomberg. As part of his efforts at removing guns from Jersey City, Healy pushed an ordinance banning the sale of more than one handgun per month per customer. This ordinance was found unconstitutional in state superior court, and an appellate court affirmed that result. However, the New Jersey government has since enacted legislation creating similar limits statewide.

== See also ==
- List of mayors of Jersey City, New Jersey

Political offices
Preceded by L. Harvey Smith	Mayor of Jersey City; 2004–2013	Succeeded by Steven Fulop
