= Steven Fulop =

American politician (born 1977)

Steve Fulop
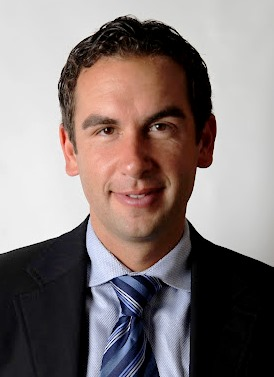

49th Mayor of Jersey City
- In office July 1, 2013 – January 14, 2026
- Preceded by: Jerramiah Healy
- Succeeded by: James Solomon

Member of Jersey City Council from Ward E
- In office July 1, 2005 – June 30, 2013
- Preceded by: Junior Maldonado
- Succeeded by: Candice Osborne

Personal details
- Born: Steven Michael Fulop; February 28, 1977 (age 49) Edison, New Jersey, U.S.
- Party: Democratic (before 2004-2026); Independent (2026-present)
- Spouse: Jacklyn Thompson (m. 2016)
- Education: Binghamton University (BA); Columbia University (MPA); New York University (MBA)

Military service
- Allegiance: United States
- Branch/service: United States Marine Corps
- Years of service: 2002–2006
- Rank: Corporal
- Unit: 6th Engineer Support Battalion
- Battles/wars: Iraq War

Steven Michael Fulop (born February 28, 1977) is an American politician who served as the 49th mayor of Jersey City, New Jersey from 2013 to 2026. A member of the Democratic Party, he was formerly the Councilman for Jersey City's Ward E. from 2005 to 2013.

Fulop was first elected mayor on May 14, 2013, defeating incumbent mayor Jerramiah Healy. Fulop was re-elected in 2017 with 78% of the vote, the largest margin for a mayor in the city since 1949. He was again re-elected in 2021, becoming the first Jersey City mayor to win a third term since Frank Hague. Fulop did not seek re-election to a fourth term as mayor, instead he ran for the Democratic nomination for governor of New Jersey in 2025, but lost to Mikie Sherrill. In October 2025, he was announced as the next president of the Partnership for New York City.

== Early life ==
Fulop was born on February 28, 1977, in Edison, New Jersey, to Jewish parents, Carmen and Arthur Fulop. Both of his parents were born in Romania; his maternal grandparents were Holocaust survivors. His father, who owned a delicatessen in Newark, New Jersey, grew up in Israel and served as a sniper in the Golani Brigade during the Six-Day War. Fulop often worked at the deli, while his mother worked in an immigration services office.

Fulop attended Rabbi Pesach Raymon Yeshiva, an Orthodox day school in Edison, through sixth grade. He then transferred to the Solomon Schechter Day School of Essex and Union (now Golda Och Academy) in West Orange, New Jersey. After two years, he enrolled in public school and graduated from J. P. Stevens High School in Edison.

In 1999, Fulop graduated from Harpur College at Binghamton University, where he had also studied abroad at Oxford University. He later earned dual master's degrees in 2006: a Master of Business Administration from the New York University Stern School of Business and a Master of Public Administration from the School of International and Public Affairs at Columbia University.

== Early career ==
=== Finance and military service ===
After graduating from college, Steven Fulop joined the investment banking firm Goldman Sachs, working in Chicago before moving to its downtown Manhattan and Jersey City offices. Following the September 11 terrorist attacks, he put his finance career on hold to enlist in the United States Marine Corps.

On January 14, 2003, shortly after completing boot camp, Fulop's reserve unit was activated and deployed to Iraq. He served for six months with the 6th Engineer Support Battalion, which provided engineering, logistics, water purification, and fuel support, enabling swift movement through the country. His unit's contributions and challenges were documented in several periodicals during the war. The New Jersey Star-Ledger highlighted Fulop on multiple occasions for leaving his Wall Street job to serve in the military.

After his tour in Iraq, Fulop returned to Goldman Sachs. In early 2006, he left the firm for a position at Sanford C. Bernstein & Co. and completed his service in the Marine Corps Reserve with the rank of Corporal.

=== Campaign for U.S. Representative ===
In the 2004 Democratic primary for New Jersey's 13th Congressional District, Fulop unsuccessfully challenged incumbent Bob Menendez, losing the June 8 election 12.6% to 87.4%. (Menendez was later elected to the U.S. Senate, serving three terms before resigning in 2024 following a political corruption conviction.)

=== Jersey City City Council ===
In May 2005, Steven Fulop was elected to represent Ward E on the Jersey City City Council, defeating an incumbent councilman. At 28, Fulop became the youngest member of the council by more than 17 years and the third youngest in the city's nearly 200-year history. The New York Times noted that Fulop won without establishment support, overcoming an opponent backed by prominent figures such as Congressman Robert Menendez, Jersey City Mayor Jerramiah Healy, and the Hudson County Democratic organization.

Despite being outspent by a margin of more than two-to-one, Fulop's victory was attributed to several tactical innovations highlighted by The Star-Ledger, The New York Times, and The Jersey Journal.

Fulop was re-elected in May 2009 with 63% of the vote. In 2012, The Hudson Reporter ranked him fourth on its list of Hudson County's 50 most influential people. In 2010, he led local opposition to a proposed gas pipeline through downtown Jersey City.

==== Legislation ====
As a councilman, ethics reform was one of Fulop's primary interests. In September 2007, he introduced a comprehensive ethics reform package. The proposals included restrictions on the use of city vehicles, a ban on officials holding multiple government positions, and requirements for income transparency and lobbying restrictions. After the council rejected the legislation in a 6–1–1 vote, Fulop moved to put two ethics reform referendums before the voters.

The first referendum aimed to prevent "double dipping," the practice of collecting more than one taxpayer-funded salary. While state law prohibits banning an official from holding multiple offices via a popular vote, it does permit a municipality to withhold a second paycheck and benefits if approved by referendum. The goal was to reduce the financial incentive for holding multiple government jobs. The second referendum sought to bar any entity doing business with the city from making political contributions to local candidates for one year. This measure was intended to prevent developers, contractors, and other interested parties from financially influencing elected officials who have power over their specific interests.

==== Political prospects ====
Following his re-election to the council, some observers expected Fulop to run for mayor in 2013. His political influence was demonstrated in 2010 when a slate of candidates he backed won all three open seats on the Board of Education.

In September 2016, Fulop decided against a run for governor and instead endorsed his former rival, Phil Murphy. He then chose to run for a second mayoral term.

== Mayor of Jersey City (2013–2026) ==
On May 14, 2013, Fulop defeated incumbent mayor Jerramiah T. Healy with 53% of the vote to become the 49th mayor of Jersey City. He took office on July 1, 2013, with the stated goal of making Jersey City the "best mid-sized city in the country." Citing population growth and residential construction, Fulop predicted that Jersey City would surpass Newark, New Jersey, to become the state's largest city by late 2016.

Fulop, who had a reputation as a reformer on the city council, ran on a platform of government transformation, improved public safety, expanded services, and stabilized taxes. He is a member of the Mayors Against Illegal Guns Coalition.

On January 3, 2023, Fulop announced he would not seek a fourth term in 2025. On April 11, 2023, he announced his candidacy for Governor of New Jersey. Following his June 2025 loss in the Democratic primary, Fulop announced that in October 2025 that he would begin leading the business advocacy group Partnership for New York City after his third term ends.

=== First Term Initiatives (2013–2017) ===
Within his first 100 days, Fulop merged the Police and Fire Departments and the Office of Emergency Management into a single Department of Public Safety, a move projected to save money by eliminating administrative redundancies. He tasked the new department with increasing diversity in its recruitment and retention. The police force grew from 778 officers when he took office to a projected 840 by June 2014.

To increase government transparency and responsiveness, Fulop established the city's first Citizen Public Safety Advisory Review Board via executive order. He also overhauled the "Mayor's Action Bureau," renaming it the "Residents Response Center" and expanding its staff and hours.

Fulop's administration implemented several city-wide improvements. In 2014, he announced a $6 million investment in renovating 13 city parks and provided funding to accelerate the construction of Berry Lane Park. To incentivize development beyond the waterfront, his administration created a tiered tax abatement policy. In February 2014, the city issued a request for proposals to restore the historic Loew's Jersey Theatre. The administration's first budget, introduced in March 2014, cut property taxes by 2.1 percent. Fulop also started the Jersey City Mural Arts Program and a prisoner re-entry program led by former Governor Jim McGreevey.

In September 2013, Jersey City became the first city in New Jersey to require paid sick leave for most employees after Fulop and the municipal council passed the legislation. A strong supporter of LGBTQ rights, Fulop officiated a midnight wedding ceremony when same-sex marriage was legalized in New Jersey. During his administration, Jersey City has received a perfect score from the Human Rights Campaign's Municipal Equality Index. In September 2015, the city expanded healthcare coverage to transgender municipal employees, a first in the state.

In September 2015, Jersey City launched a Citi Bike bikeshare program, connected to New York City's system. The city also launched United Rescue, a volunteer, app-based emergency medical first-responder program designed to reduce EMS response times. In October 2015, Jersey City legalized Airbnb and launched an open data portal to make government information more accessible. In February 2016, Fulop signed an executive order making Jersey City the first in the state to set a $15 minimum wage for city employees.

=== Second and third term initiatives (2017–2025) ===
In May 2018, Fulop opposed providing subsidies for a real estate project from the Kushner family, which had requested a 30-year tax break and about $9 million in city-issued bonds.

On March 16, 2020, in response to the COVID-19 pandemic, Fulop ordered the temporary closure of the Jersey City Newport Centre and Hudson Mall, an action Governor Phil Murphy extended to all malls statewide the following day.

Under Fulop's leadership, Jersey City implemented Vision Zero, and subsequently became one of the few American cities to have a full year with no road crash deaths. He supports congestion pricing to reduce traffic and raise funds for NJ Transit and the PATH. In January 2025, he proposed a congestion toll for New York drivers entering Jersey City.

=== Controversies ===
==== Katyń Memorial ====
In May 2018, Fulop announced plans to move the Katyń Massacre Memorial from its location at Exchange Place. The plan drew criticism from Polish officials, including Speaker of the Polish Senate Stanisław Karczewski, whom Fulop called "a known anti-Semite, white nationalist + holocaust denier." Holocaust survivor Edward Mosberg and Polish Jewish community leaders also opposed the move.

After initially reaching an agreement with Poland's consul general to move the statue about 200 feet (60 m) away, the issue was resolved in December 2018 when the Jersey City Council voted unanimously to keep the monument in its original location "in perpetuity."

==== Dixon Advisory ====
Beginning in 2019, Fulop's mayoral campaign received large donations from the Australian property investment firm Dixon Advisory. Fulop also socialized with the firm's managing partner, Alan S. Dixon. Subsequently, Fulop cancelled property value reassessments that could have increased taxes on properties owned by the firm. Reports also surfaced that Dixon remodeled Fulop-owned properties at a discount and arranged for Fulop to purchase a "trophy" property from the firm that was not publicly listed. Dixon Advisory later went bankrupt, with its clients recovering a small fraction of their investments.

==== Inclusionary Zoning Ordinance ====
In October 2020, Fulop supported an Inclusionary Zoning Ordinance (IZO). The ordinance faced criticism for being too flexible. Bassam Gergi, an attorney for the Fair Share Housing Center, called it "one of the weakest, if not the weakest housing ordinances in New Jersey." Despite hours of critical public comment, the city council passed the measure 7–2.

The Fair Share Housing Center sued the city to overturn the IZO in December 2020. In August 2021, a Hudson County judge threw out the ordinance, ruling that the city had violated state land use law by not referring it to the Planning Board before adoption.

==== Waste Collection Tax ====
In January 2021, the Jersey City Municipal Utilities Authority enacted a fee on water usage to fund the city's $15.1 million waste and recycling contract. The fee was intended to ensure that tax-abated properties contributed to the cost. The bill was approved in September 2020, a year in which Fulop had promised no tax increases.

Opposed by residents and businesses as a "backdoor tax," the fee was suspended by Fulop ahead of the November 2021 elections. He acknowledged that residents were "being way overcharged on what was supposed to be a nominal fee" and said the formula would be reevaluated.

== 2025 gubernatorial campaign ==
In April 2023, Steven Fulop became the first candidate to declare his intention to seek the Democratic nomination for the 2025 New Jersey gubernatorial election, launching his campaign to succeed Governor Phil Murphy two years before the primary.

=== Transportation proposals ===
In August 2023, Fulop unveiled a statewide transportation agenda. Key proposals included:

- Praising Manhattan's congestion pricing program and proposing a similar tax on New York drivers entering New Jersey, with the revenue dedicated to the Port Authority's PATH system.
- Financially supporting NJ Transit to expand service and renovate stations, suggesting funds could be generated by reinstating a corporate business tax, estimated to yield $1 billion in revenue.
- Moving the PATH system from the Port Authority to NJ Transit's jurisdiction, asserting that the Port Authority does not prioritize the system.
- Expanding a ride-sharing service, similar to the VIA program launched in Jersey City in 2020, to the ten densest cities in the state to serve transit deserts.
- Limiting in-person transactions at MVC locations to 30 minutes and expanding the number of services available online.
- Focusing on prioritizing rail over road expansion projects.

=== Affordable housing plan ===
In October 2023, Fulop announced a plan to address New Jersey's affordable housing crisis, stating his goal to "double the current rate of affordable housing production." The plan includes:

- Reforming the Council on Affordable Housing to streamline the process for municipalities.
- Exceeding the obligations of the New Jersey Fair Housing Act.
- Coordinating a regional approach to mixed-income housing around mass transit.
- Reworking the New Jersey Economic Development Authority incentive program.
- Re-establishing the Office of the Public Advocate.
- Ensuring dedicated funding for the Affordable Housing Trust Fund to support housing for residents at or below 80% of the Area Median Income.

Fulop finished third in the June 2025 Democratic gubernatorial primary, behind winner Mikie Sherrill and Newark mayor Ras Baraka.

== Post mayoral career ==
In 2023, Fulop announced that he would not seek reelection in 2025 and that this would be his final term as Jersey City mayor, a role he had held since 2013, explaining his desire to run for governor. In October 2025, the nonprofit Partnership for New York City named Fulop as its next president and chief executive. He was selected to succeed Kathryn Wylde, who had led the organization since 2000. A 13-person search committee, led by Tishman Speyer CEO Rob Speyer and Pfizer CEO Albert Bourla, selected Fulop.

== Personal life ==
Fulop owns a second home in Narragansett, Rhode Island, where he has described his family as "longtime residents." He unsuccessfully lobbied the town council to ban public parking on his street.

An avid endurance athlete, Fulop has completed several marathons and the 2012 Ironman U.S. Championship, finishing in 11 hours and 58 minutes.

Prior to his election to the municipal council, Fulop was president of the Downtown Coalition of Neighborhood Associations (DCNA) and The Historic Paulus Hook Association in Jersey City. He has also served on the boards of the Columbia University Alumni Association and the Learning Community Charter School in Jersey City.

== Electoral history ==
New Jersey Democratic Gubernatorial Primary Election, June 6, 2025
Party	Candidate	Votes	%
Democratic	Mikie Sherrill	286,244	34.02
Democratic	Ras Baraka	173,951	20.67
Democratic	Steven Fulop	134,573	15.99
Democratic	Other candidates	246,667	29.32
Total votes		841,435	100.00

Jersey City Mayoral Election, November 2, 2021
Party	Candidate	Votes	%
Democratic	Steven Fulop	28,562	67.41
Democratic	Lewis Spears	13,741	32.43
Total votes		42,373	100.00

Jersey City Mayoral Election, November 7, 2017
Party	Candidate	Votes	%
Democratic	Steven Fulop	29,739	77.54
Democratic	Bill Matsikoudis	8,559	22.32
Total votes		38,298	100.00

Jersey City Mayoral Election, May 14, 2013
Party	Candidate	Votes	%
Democratic	Steven Fulop	20,983	52.94
Democratic	Jerramiah Healy (incumbent)	14,931	37.67
Independent	Jerry Walker	3,290	8.30
Independent	Abdul J. Malik	407	1.03
Other	Personal Choice	28	0.07
Turnout		39,639	28.54%
Democratic hold			

Jersey City Ward E Council election, May 12, 2009
Party	Candidate	Votes	%
Democratic	Steve Fulop (incumbent)	1,987	61.03
Democratic	Guy Catrillo	767	23.56
Democratic	Jaime Vazquez	269	8.26
Democratic	Joseph J. Tarrazi	181	5.56
Democratic	Azam A. Riaz	51	1.57
Total votes		3,256	100.00

Jersey City Ward E Council election, May 10, 2005
Party	Candidate	Votes	%
Democratic	Steve Fulop	2,165	54.58
Democratic	E. Junior Maldonado (incumbent)	1,802	45.42
Total votes		3,967	100.00

U.S. House of Representatives Democratic Primary, New Jersey's 13th Congressional District, June 8, 2004
Party	Candidate	Votes	%
Democratic	Bob Menendez (incumbent)	33,622	87.39
Democratic	Steve Fulop	4,851	12.61
Total votes		38,473	100.00

Political offices
Preceded by Jerramiah Healy	Mayor of Jersey City; 2013–2026	Succeeded by James Solomon
