= Jersey City, New Jersey =

City in Hudson County, New Jersey, US

- City
- City of Jersey City
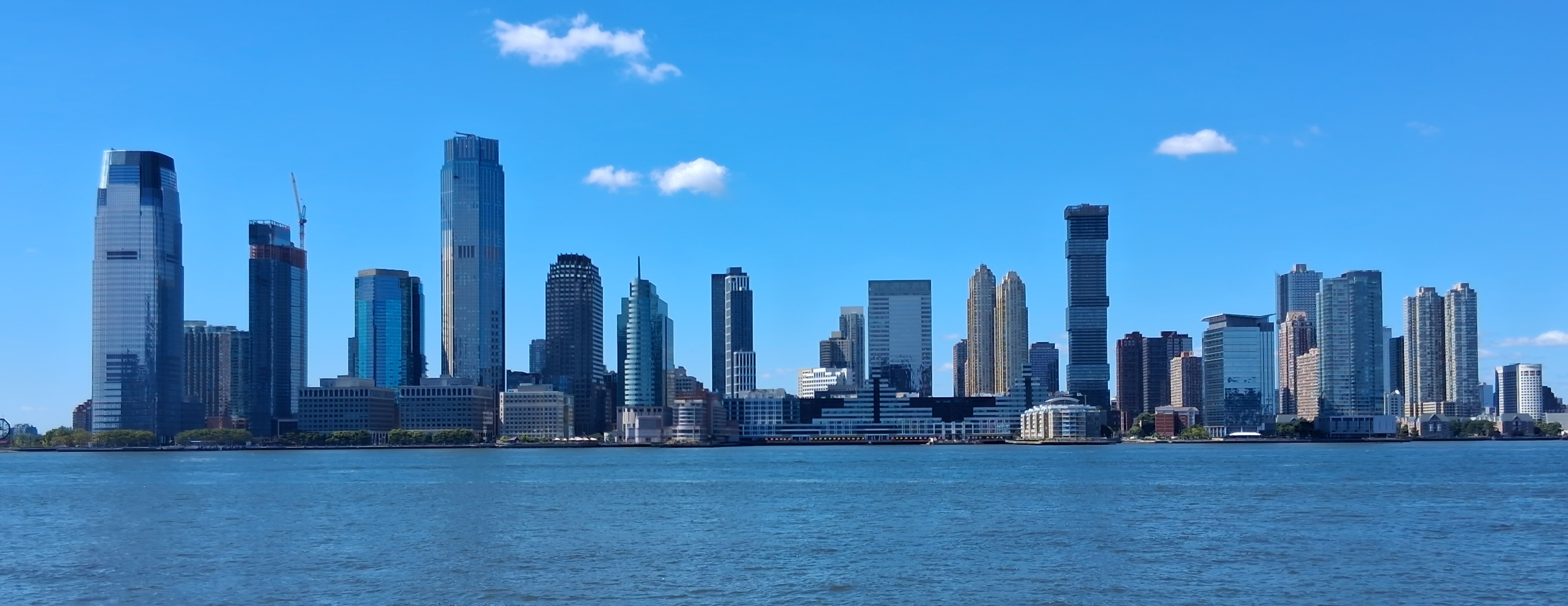
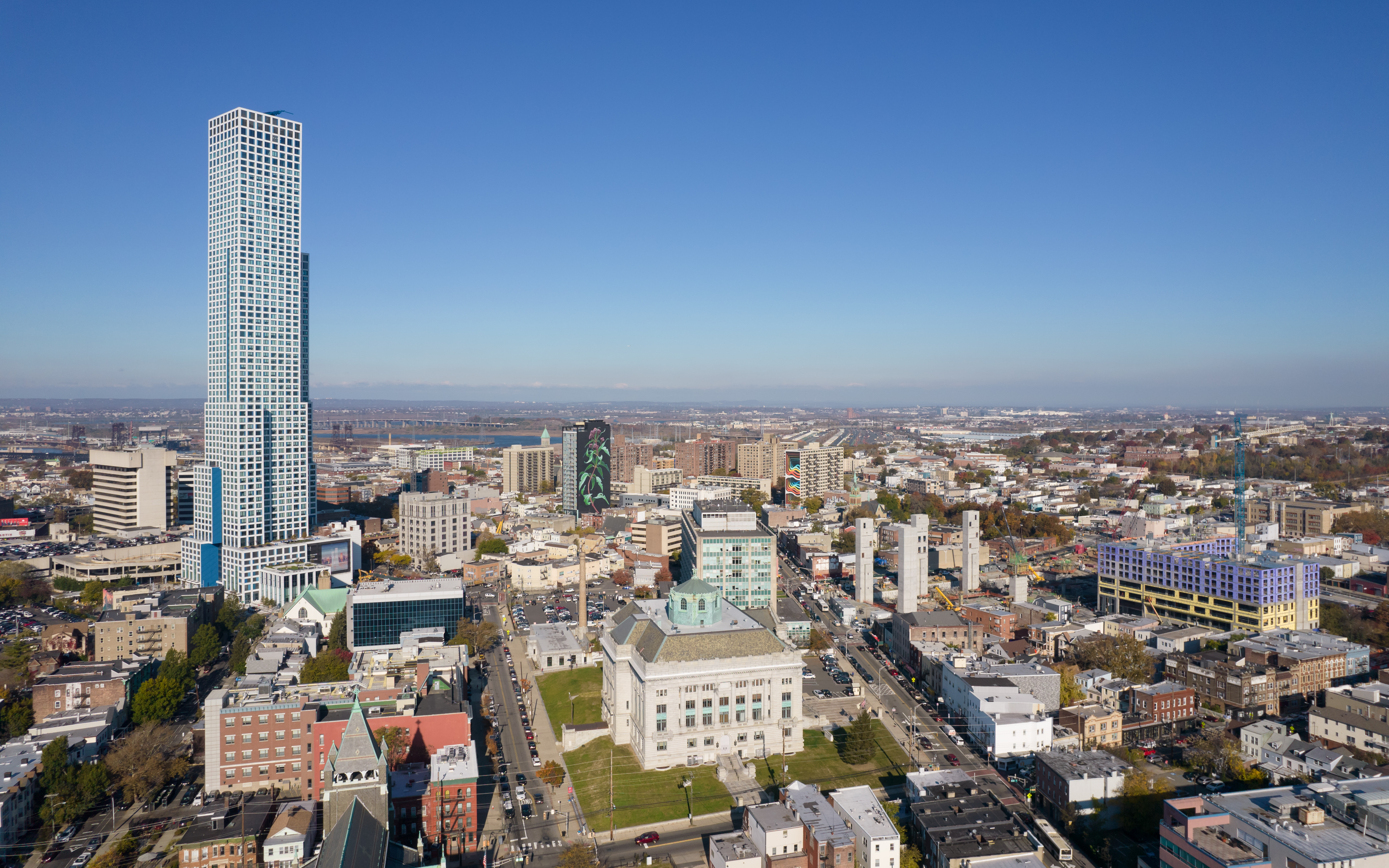
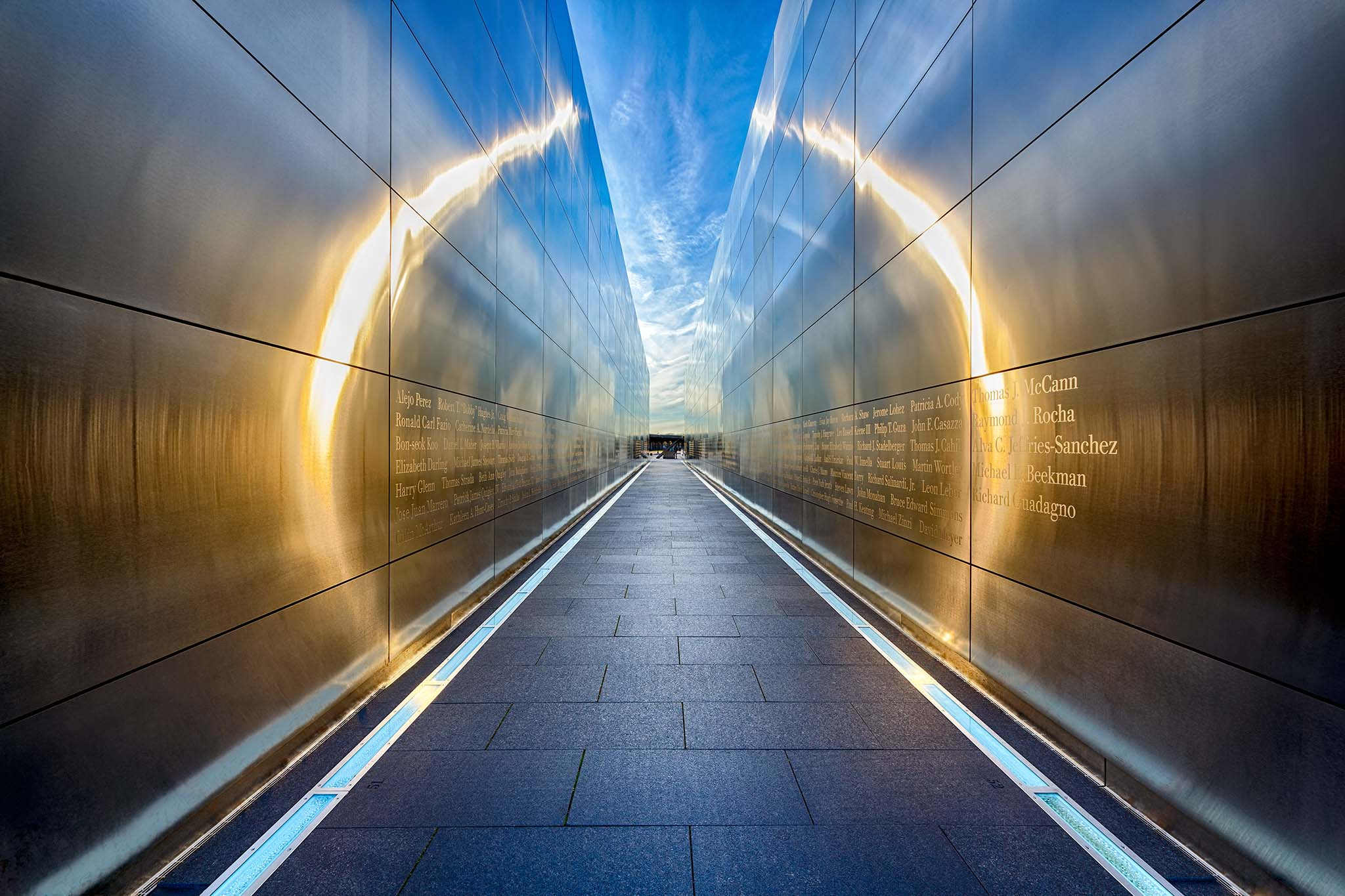
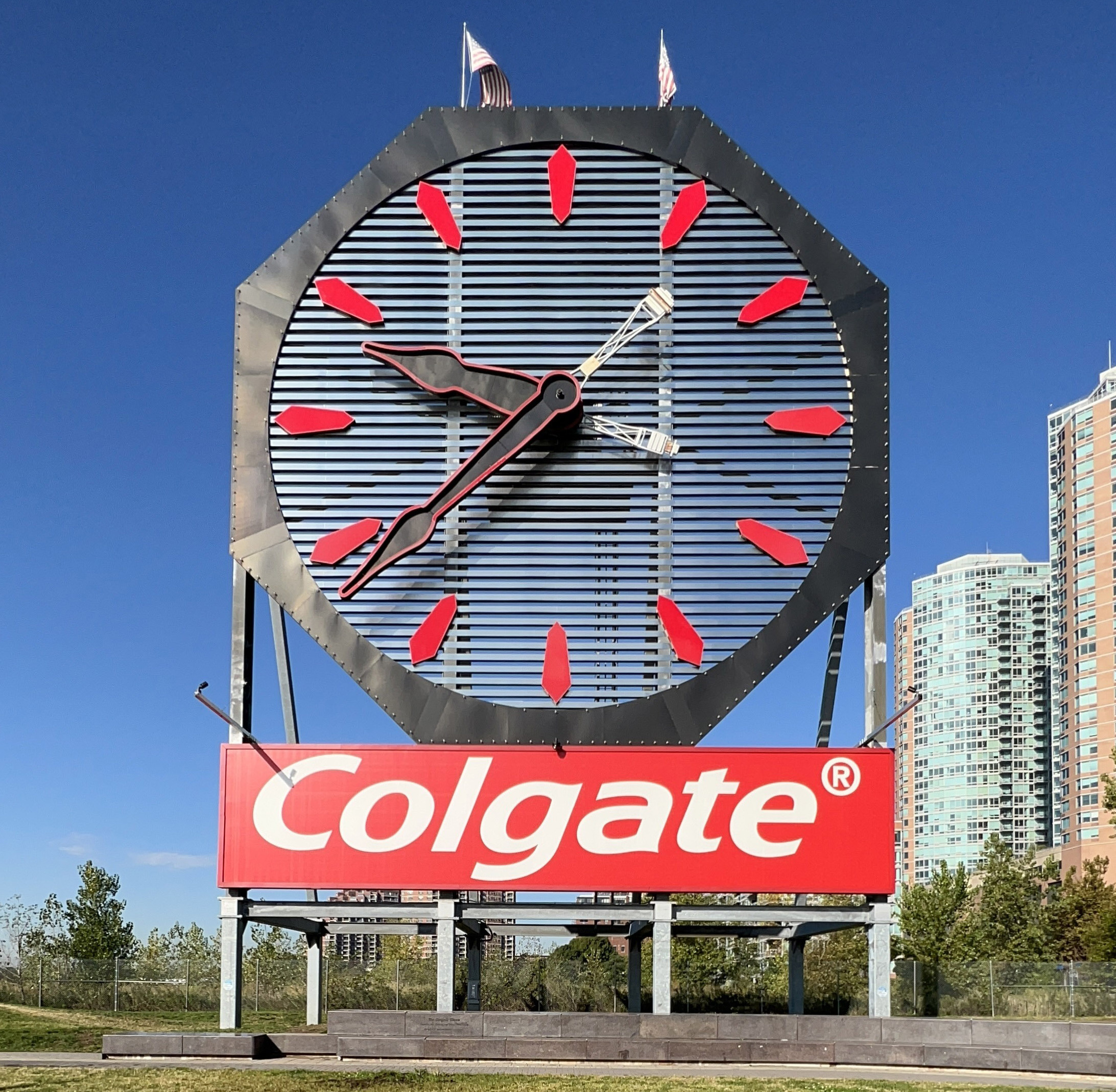
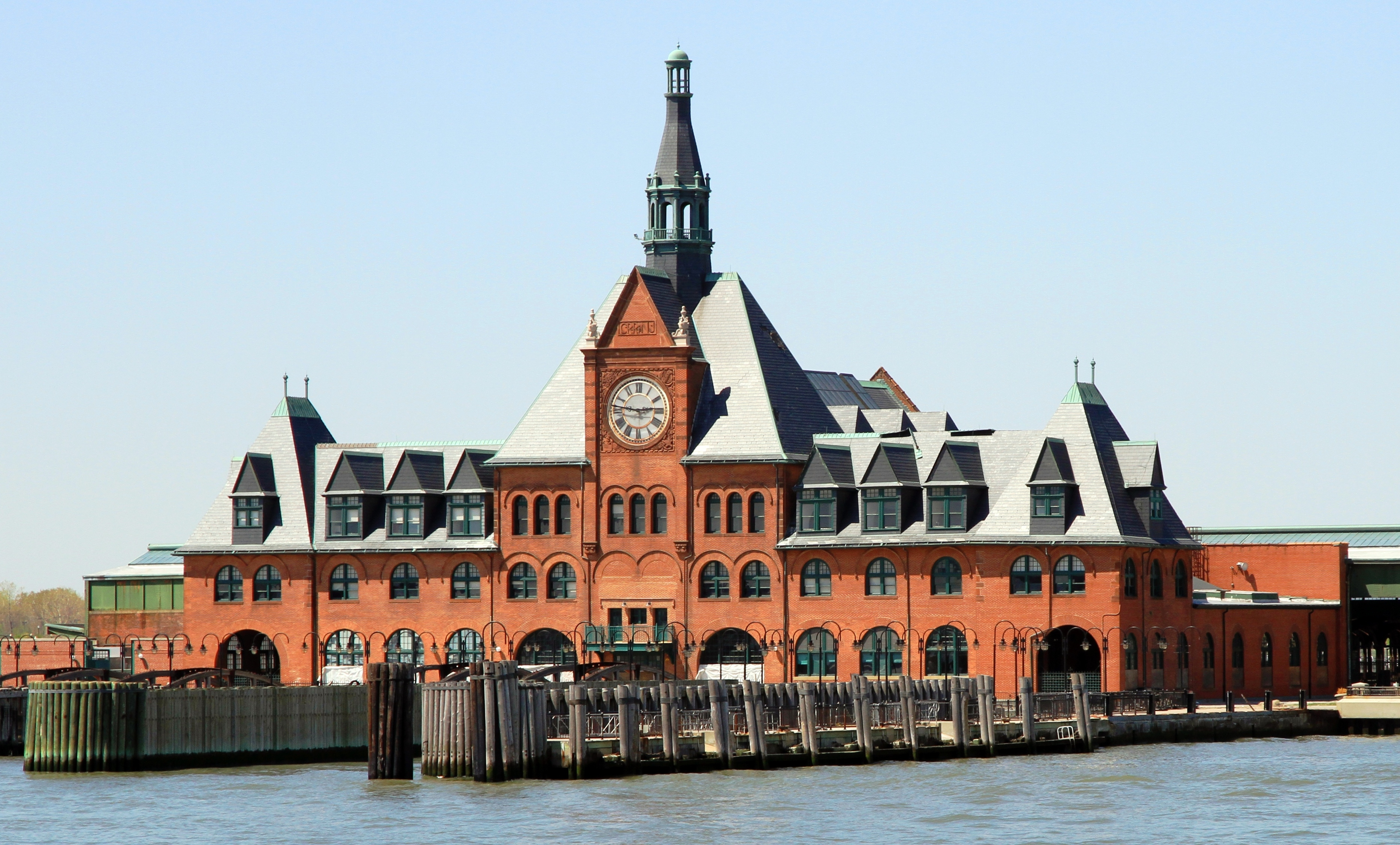
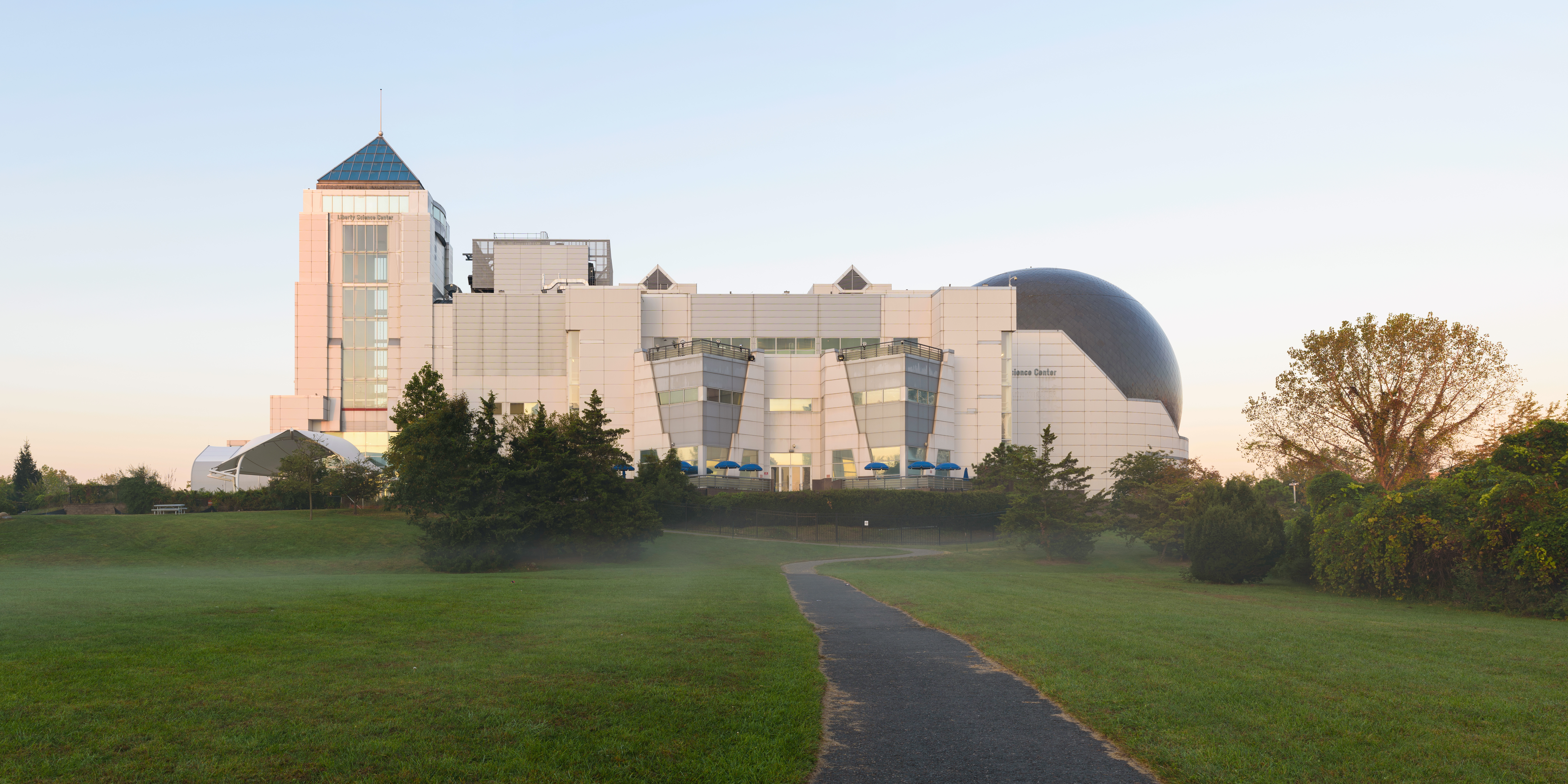
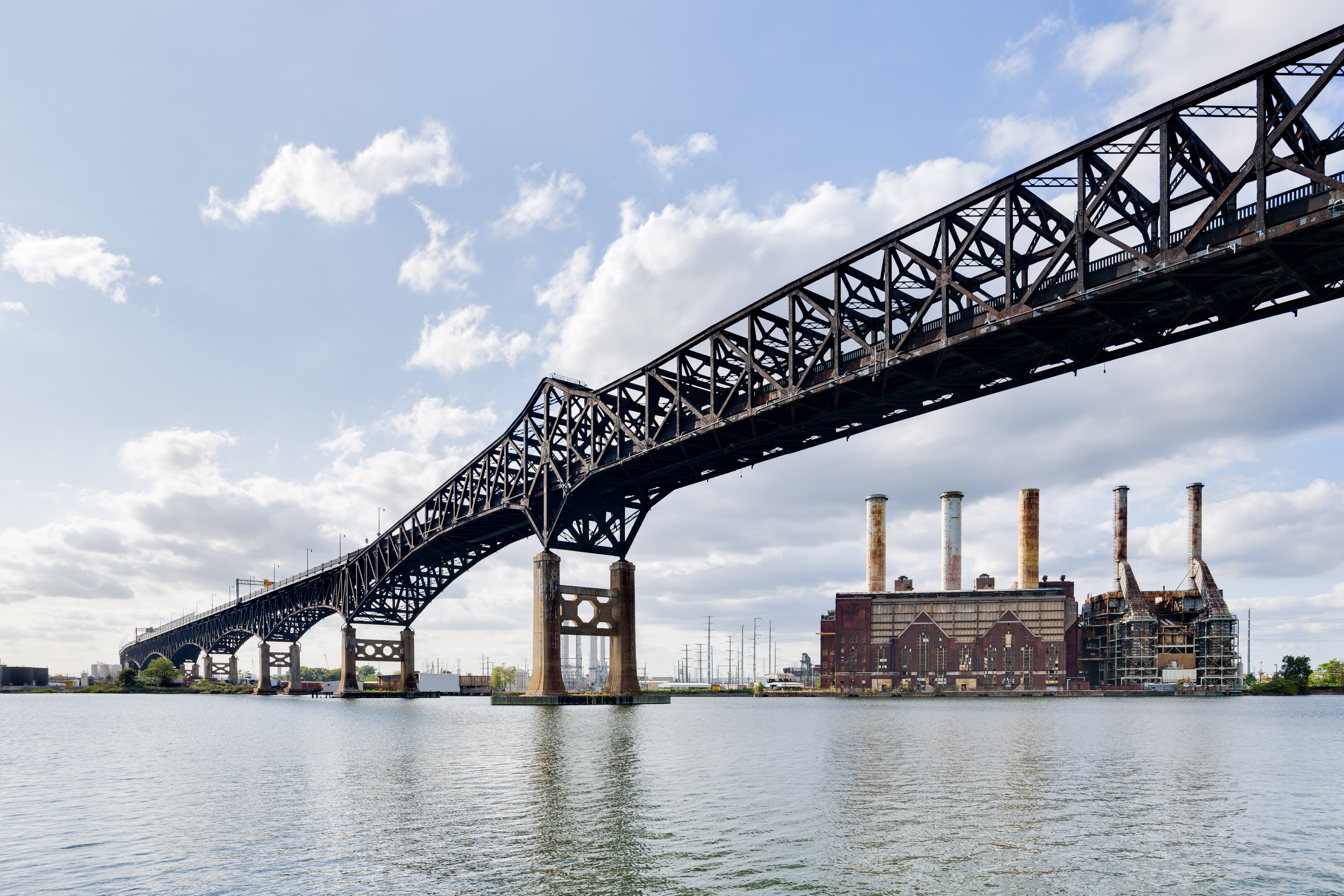
- Downtown Jersey City skyline Journal Square Empty Sky Memorial Colgate Clock The Central Railroad of New Jersey Terminal Liberty Science Center Pulaski Skyway

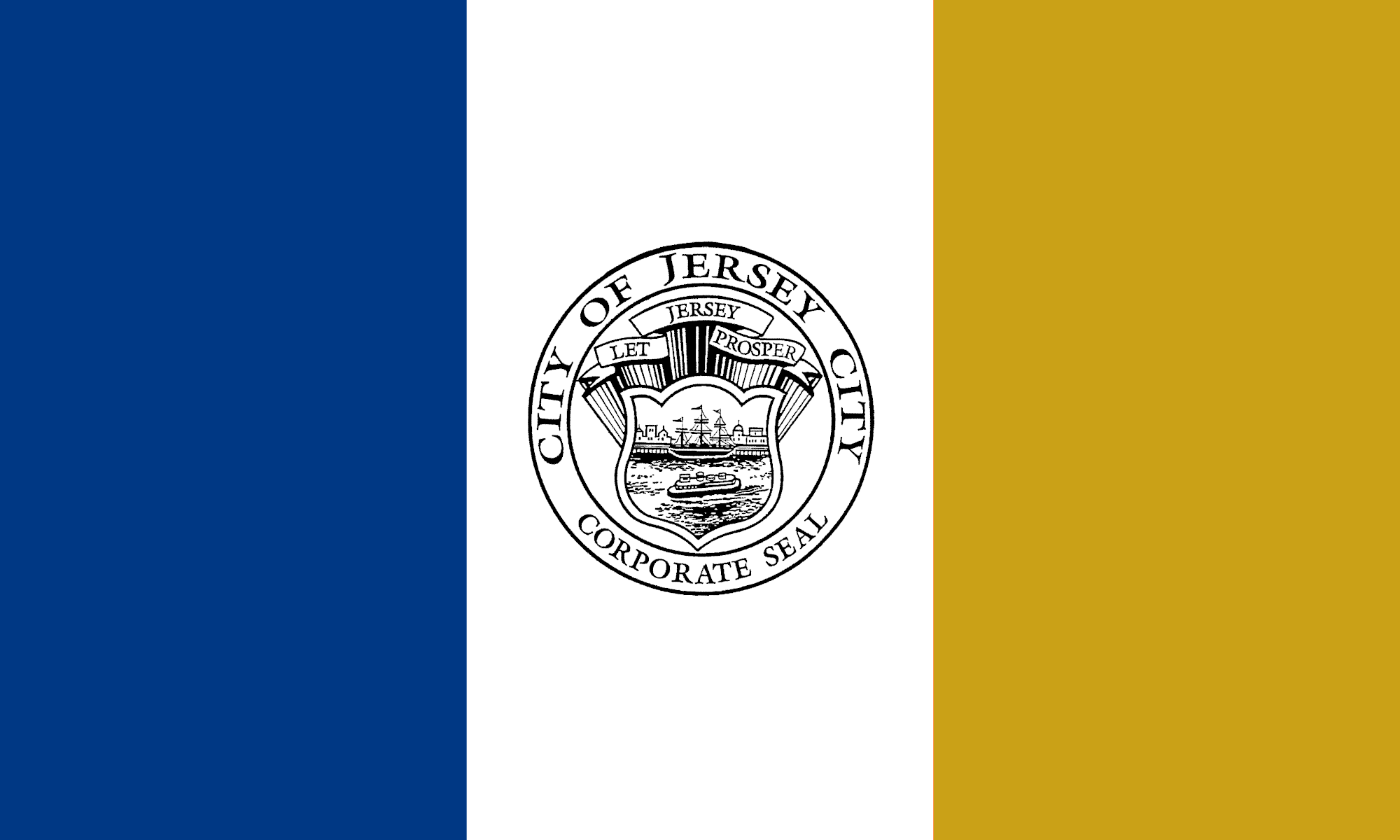
- Flag Seal Wordmark
- Nicknames: JC, Chilltown, The Sixth Borough, America's Golden Door, Wall Street West
- Motto(s): "Let Jersey Prosper" "Jersey City, Make It Yours"
- Interactive map of Jersey City, New Jersey
- Location within Hudson County Location within New Jersey Location within the United States
- Coordinates: 40°42′36″N 74°03′36″W
- Country: United States
- State: New Jersey
- County: Hudson
- European settlement: 1630
- Incorporated: February 22, 1838
- Named for: New Jersey

Government
  - Type: Faulkner Act (mayor–council)
  - Body: City Council
  - Mayor: James Solomon (D)
  - Deputy mayor: Dia Bryant (education)
  - Business Administrator: Ruby B. Choi
  - Municipal clerk: Sean J. Gallagher

Area
  - Total: 21.03 sq mi (54.48 km^{2})
  - Land: 14.75 sq mi (38.20 km^{2})
  - Water: 6.29 sq mi (16.28 km^{2}) 30.24%
  - Rank: 134th of 565 in state 1st of 12 in county
- Elevation: 20 ft (6.1 m)

Population (2020)
  - Total: 292,449
  - Estimate (2025): 302,013 ▲
  - Rank: 71st in country (as of 2025); 2nd of 565 in state 1st of 12 in county
  - Density: 19,835.1/sq mi (7,658.4/km^{2})
  - Rank: 10th of 565 in state 7th of 12 in county
- Time zone: UTC−05:00 (EST)
  - Summer (DST): UTC−04:00 (Eastern (EDT))
- ZIP Codes: 07097, 07302-07308, 07310-07311
- Area codes: 201/551
- FIPS code: 3401736000
- GNIS feature ID: 0885264
- Website: jerseycitynj.gov

Jersey City is the second-most populous city in the U.S. state of New Jersey, after Newark. It is the county seat of Hudson County, the county's most populous city and its largest by area. As of the 2020 United States census, the city's population was 292,449, an increase of 44,852 (+18.1%) from the 2010 census count of 247,597. (The Population Estimates Program calculated a population of 302,013 for 2025.) As of 2020, more than 40 languages are spoken in over 52% of households, and 42.5% of residents were born outside the United States making the city the most ethnically diverse in the United States.

The third most-populous city in the New York metropolitan area, Jersey City is bounded on the east by the Hudson River and Upper New York Bay and on the west by the Hackensack River and Newark Bay. A port of entry, with 30.7 miles (49.4 km) of waterfront and extensive rail infrastructure and connectivity, the city is an important transportation terminus and distribution and manufacturing center for the Port of New York and New Jersey with Port Jersey as the city's intermodal freight transport facility and container shipping terminal. The Holland Tunnel, PATH rapid transit system, NJ Transit bus and NY Waterway ferry service connect across the Hudson River with Manhattan.

The area was settled by the Dutch in the 17th century as Pavonia and later established as Bergen, the first permanent settlement, local civil government and oldest municipality in what became the state of New Jersey. The area came under English control in 1664. Jersey City was incorporated in 1838 and annexed Van Vorst Township in 1851. On May 3, 1870, following a special election in 1869 with a majority of county support, Jersey City annexed Bergen City and Hudson City to form "Greater Jersey City" with Greenville Township joining in 1873. Jersey City grew into a busy port city on New York Harbor by the late 19th and early 20th century. Jersey City's official motto, displayed on the city seal and flag, is "Let Jersey Prosper" referencing its 19th-century border dispute with New York City.

Jersey City is home to several institutions of higher education such as Kean Jersey City, Saint Peter's University and Hudson County Community College. As the county seat, Jersey City is home to the Hudson County Courthouse and Frank J. Guarini Justice Complex. Cultural venues throughout the city include the Loew's Jersey Theatre, White Eagle Hall, the Liberty Science Center, Ellis Island, Mana Contemporary and the Museum of Jersey City History. Large parks in Jersey City are Liberty State Park, Lincoln Park and Berry Lane Park. Redevelopment of the Jersey City waterfront has made the city one of the largest hubs for banking and finance in the United States and has led to the district and city being nicknamed Wall Street West. Since the 1990s, Jersey City has been a destination for artists and hipsters. With the city's proximity and connections to Manhattan, its growing arts, culture, culinary and nightlife scene and its own finance and tech based economy, apartment rents in the city have grown to become some of the highest in the United States. In response, Jersey City has instituted zoning and legislation to require developers to include affordable housing units in their developments. In 2023 and 2025, Travel + Leisure ranked Jersey City as the best place to live in New Jersey.

== History ==
=== Lenape and New Netherland ===
The land that is now Jersey City was part of Lenapehoking and inhabited by the Lenape, a collection of Native American tribes (later called the Delaware Indian) that were part of the Algonquian nation. In 1609, Henry Hudson, seeking an alternate route to East Asia on behalf of the Dutch East India Company, anchored his small vessel Halve Maen (English: Half Moon) at Sandy Hook, Harsimus Cove and Weehawken Cove, and elsewhere along what was later named the North River. After spending nine days surveying the area and meeting its inhabitants, he sailed as far north as Albany and later claimed the region for the Netherlands. The contemporary flag of the city is a variation on the Prince's Flag from the Netherlands. The stripes are blue, white and yellow, with the center of the flag showing the city seal, depicting Hudson's ship, the Half Moon, and other modern vessels.

By 1621, the Dutch West India Company was organized to manage this new territory and in June 1623, New Netherland became a Dutch province, with headquarters in New Amsterdam. Michael Reyniersz Pauw received a land grant as patroon on the condition that he would establish a settlement of not fewer than fifty persons within four years. He chose the west bank of the Hudson River and purchased the land from the Lenape for 80 fathoms (146 m) of wampum, 20 fathoms (37 m) of cloth, 12 kettles, six guns, two blankets, one double kettle, and half a barrel of beer. This grant is dated November 22, 1630, and is the earliest known conveyance for what are now Hoboken and Jersey City. Pauw, however, was an absentee landlord who neglected to populate the area and was obliged to sell his holdings back to the Company in 1633. That year, a house was built at Communipaw for Jan Evertsen Bout, superintendent of the colony, which had been named Pavonia (the Latinized form of Pauw's name means "peacock" and Pavonia means "land of the peacock"). Shortly after, another house was built at Harsimus Cove in 1634 and became the home of Cornelius Henrick Van Vorst, who had succeeded Bout as superintendent, and whose family would become influential in the development of the city.

By the 1640s, relations with the Lenape deteriorated, in part because Director-General Willem Kieft attempted to drive out the Lenape through intimidation and taxation. During Kieft's War, approximately 120 Lenape were killed by the Dutch, including women and children, in a massacre ordered by Kieft at Pavonia on the night of February 25, 1643. The attack was ordered without the approval of his advisory council, against the wishes of the colonists and led to a series of raids and reprisals by the Lenape and the virtual destruction of the settlement on the west bank. On May 11, 1647, Peter Stuyvesant arrived in New Amsterdam to replace Kieft as Director-General of New Netherland. On September 15, 1655, Pavonia was attacked as part of a Munsee occupation of New Amsterdam called the Peach War that saw 40 colonists killed and over 100, mostly women and children, taken captive and held at Paulus Hook. They were later ransomed to New Amsterdam.

On January 10, 1658, Stuyvesant "re-purchased" the scattered communities of farmsteads that characterized the Dutch settlements of Pavonia: Communipaw, Harsimus, Paulus Hook, Hoebuck, Awiehaken, Pamrapo, and other lands "behind Kill van Kull". The village of Bergen (located inside a palisaded garrison) was established by the settlers who wished to return to the west bank of the Hudson on what is now Bergen Square in 1660, the first town square in North America, and officially chartered by Stuyvesant on September 5, 1661, as the state's first local civil government. The village was designed by Jacques Cortelyou, the first surveyor of New Amsterdam. The word berg taken from the Dutch means "hill", while bergen means "place of safety." The charter partially removed Bergen from the jurisdiction of New Amsterdam and put the surrounding settlements under its authority. As a result, it is regarded as the first permanent settlement and oldest municipality in what would become the state of New Jersey. It is also the home of Public School No. 11, the nation's longest-continuous school site and the site of the first free public school building in New Jersey. Furthermore, Old Bergen Church is the oldest continuous congregation in New Jersey. In addition, the oldest surviving houses in Jersey City are of Dutch origin including the Newkirk House (1690), the Van Vorst Farmhouse (1740), and the Van Wagenen House (1740).

In 1661, Communipaw Ferry began operation as the first ferry service between the village of Communipaw (Jersey City) and New Amsterdam (Manhattan) shortly after the village of Bergen was established.

==== Province of New Jersey ====
On August 27, 1664, four English frigates sailed into New York Harbor and captured Fort Amsterdam, and by extension, all of New Netherland, a prelude to the Second Anglo-Dutch War, and renamed it New York. Under the Articles of Capitulation, the Dutch residents of Bergen were allowed to continue their way of life and worship. Later in 1664, the Duke of York (later James II), granted his new land between the Hudson River and Delaware River to Sir George Carteret in recognition of his loyalty to the Crown through the English Civil War. Carteret named the land New Jersey after his homeland, the Channel Island of Jersey. The Concession and Agreement was issued soon after providing religious freedom and recognition of private property in the colony. In exchange, residents were required to pledge loyalty to their new government and pay annual fees known as quit-rents. In 1668, the Bergen town charter was confirmed by Philip Carteret, the first English provincial Governor of New Jersey.

Following the Treaty of Westminster, New Jersey split into East Jersey and West Jersey. From 1674 to 1702, Bergen was part of East Jersey and became a town in Bergen County on March 7, 1683, one of the four newly independent counties in East Jersey. In 1702, New Jersey was reunified and became a royal colony. In 1710, by royal decree of Queen Anne of Great Britain, Bergen County was enlarged to include land that had been a part of Essex County. As a result, the village of Hackensack (in the newly formed New Barbados Township) was considered more accessible by the majority of the county's new inhabitants and became the new county seat. Bergen was later re-established by royal charter on January 4, 1714.

=== 18th century ===
By the 1760s, Paulus Hook was known for its convenient stagecoach and ferry services. In 1764, Cornelius Van Vorst (1728–1818) established the Paulus Hook Ferry (later called "Jersey City Ferry") and operated the service from Paulus Hook to Cortlandt Street. To further attract patrons to his ferry landing, Van Vorst created a mile-long circular horse racing track that attracted tourists from both sides of the Hudson and built the Van Vorst Tavern near Grand and Hudson Streets as a one-story building with a Dutch roof and eaves and an overhanging porch that faced the river. To further ensure the profitability of his business ventures on the small island of Paulus Hook, he created an embankment road above the tidal marshes to the mainland. Ahead of the Revolutionary War, Van Vorst declared himself a patriot and in 1774 was appointed to one of the committees of correspondence, representing Bergen County and attended a meeting in New Brunswick to elect delegates to the Second Continental Congress.

==== American Revolution ====
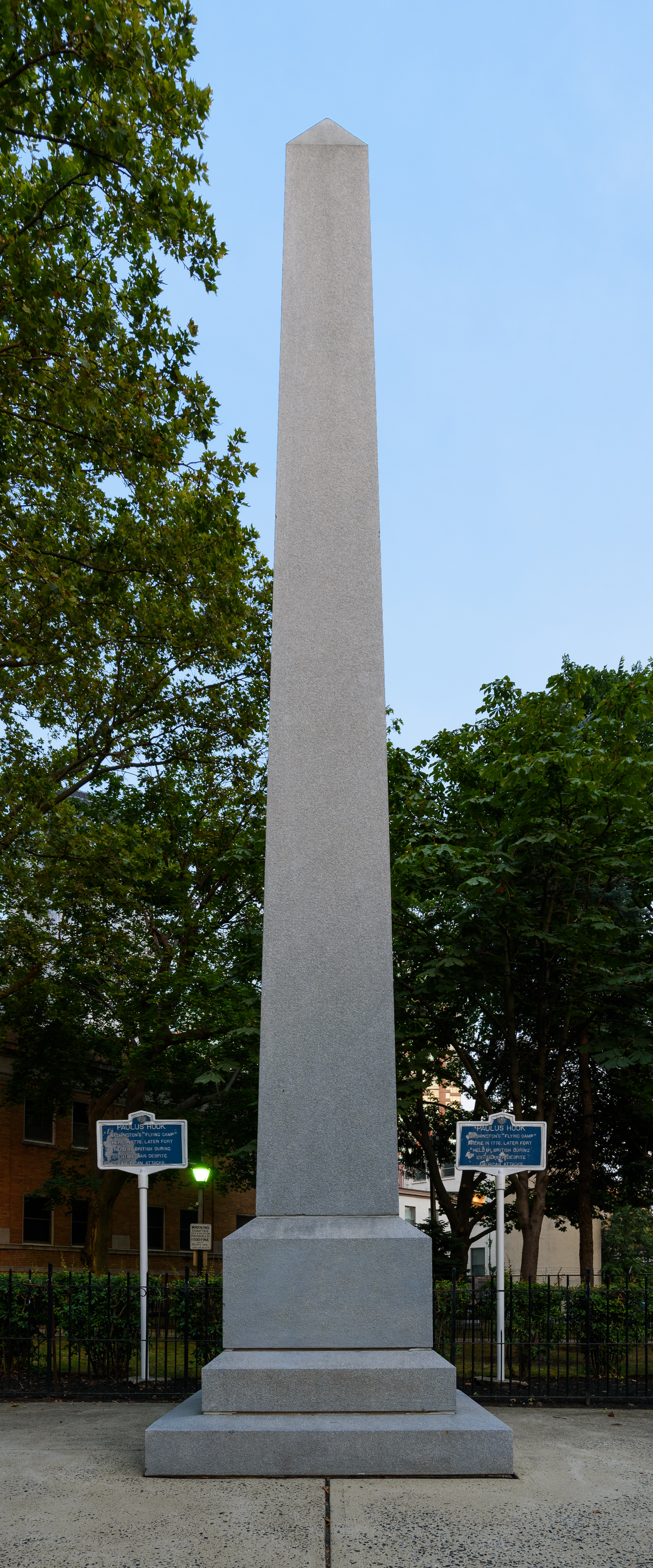
Battle of Paulus Hook Monument

In 1776, even before the war, General George Washington ordered American patriots to construct several forts to defend the western banks of the Hudson River, one of which was located at Paulus Hook. The fort was a naturally defensible position that guarded New York from British attack, guarded the Hudson River channel and the gateway to New Jersey. Following the defeat of General Washington and the Continental Army at the Battle of Brooklyn, the British took control of New York City on September 15, 1776 and turned their ships towards Paulus Hook. On September 23, the American patriots abandoned the fort and moved munitions and supplies to Bergen, leaving the fort to become the first New Jersey territory invaded and occupied by the British.

In mid-summer 1779, a 23-year-old Princeton University graduate, Major Henry Lee, recommended to General Washington a daring plan for the Continental Army to attack the fort, in what became known as the Battle of Paulus Hook. The assault was planned to begin shortly after midnight on August 19, 1779. Lee led a force of about 300 men, some of whom got lost during the march through the swampy, marshy land. The attack was late to start but the main contingent of the force was able to reach the fort's gate without being challenged. It is believed that the British mistook the approaching force for allied Hessians returning from patrol, though this has not been definitively documented.

The attacking Patriots succeeded in damaging the fort and took 158 British prisoners, but were unable to destroy the fort and spike its cannons. As daytime approached, Lee decided the prudent action was to have his Patriots withdraw before British forces from New York could cross the river. Paulus Hook remained in British hands until after the war but the battle was a small strategic victory for the forces of independence as it forced the British to abandon their plans for taking additional rebel positions in the New York area.

Later that August, General Washington met with the Marquis de Lafayette in the village of Bergen to discuss war strategy over lunch and to bait the British into attacking Bergen from New York. The meeting purportedly took place under an apple tree at the Van Wagenen House on Academy Street. Additionally, a nearby "point of rocks" at the east end of the street provided an ideal vantage point for military surveillance of the Hudson River.

One day in September 1780, a local Bergen farmer, Jane Tuers, was selling her goods in British-occupied Manhattan when she stopped in Fraunces Tavern and spoke with the owner, Samuel Fraunces. He informed Tuers that British soldiers were in his tavern toasting General Benedict Arnold, who was to deliver West Point to the British. Tuers returned to Bergen later that day and informed her brother Daniel Van Reypen about the conspiracy. Van Reypen, a staunch patriot, rode to Hackensack to meet with General Anthony Wayne who then sent Van Reypen to inform General Washington of the conspiracy. The information provided by Tuers confirmed what Washington had suspected of Arnold and led to the arrest, trial, conviction and hanging of co-conspirator John André for treason and stopped the plot to surrender West Point. Arnold would later defect to the British to escape prosecution.

On November 22, 1783, the British evacuated Paulus Hook and sailed home three days before they left New York on Evacuation Day. These events have been commemorated throughout the city. In the mid-1800s, Bergen named Lafayette Park in honor of Marquis de Lafayette, whose name is now synonymous with Communipaw. In 1903, an obelisk was erected at Paulus Hook Park at the intersection of Washington and Grand Streets, the site of the fort, to memorialize the Battle of Paulus Hook. In 1925, a plaque honoring Jane Tuer's heroism was installed at the site of her former home now Hudson Catholic Regional High School. In 2021, the restored Van Wagenen House was re-opened as the Museum of Jersey City History.

On February 21, 1798, Bergen became a township by the New Jersey Legislature's Township Act of 1798 as the first group of 104 townships in New Jersey.

=== 19th century ===
==== Urbanization ====
In 1804, Alexander Hamilton, now a private citizen, was focused on increasing manufacturing in the greater New York City area. To that end, he helped to create the "Associates of the Jersey Company" which would lay the groundwork for modern Jersey City through private development. While envisioning the future of Jersey City, Hamilton said: "One day, a great city shall rise on the western banks of the Hudson River." The consortium of 35 investors behind the company were predominantly Federalists who, like Hamilton, had been swept out of power in the election of 1800 by Thomas Jefferson and other Democratic-Republicans. Large tracts of land in Paulus Hook were purchased by the company with the titles owned by Anthony Dey, who was from a prominent old Dutch family, and his two cousins, Colonel Richard Varick, the former mayor of New York City (1789–1801), and Jacob Radcliff, a Justice of the New York Supreme Court who would later become mayor of New York City from 1810 to 1811 and again from 1815 to 1818. They laid out the city squares and streets that still characterize the neighborhood, giving them names also seen in Lower Manhattan or after war heroes (Grove, Varick, Mercer, Wayne, Monmouth and Montgomery among them). John B. Coles, a former New York State senator (1799–1802), purchased the area north of Paulus Hook known as Harsimus and laid out a grid plan centered around a park. Following Hamilton's death, Coles named the park in his honor as "Hamilton Park."

Despite Hamilton's untimely death in July 1804, the Association carried on with the New Jersey Legislature approving Hamilton's charter of incorporation on November 10, 1804. However, the enterprise was mired in a legal boundary dispute between New York City and the state of New Jersey over who owned the waterfront. This along with the associated press coverage discouraged investors who wanted lots on the waterfront for commercial purposes. The unresolved dispute would continue until the Treaty of 1834 where New York City formally ceded control of the Jersey City waterfront to New Jersey. Over that time though, the Jersey Company opened the city's first medical facility, known as the "pest house", in 1808 and applied to the New Jersey Legislature to incorporate the "Town of Jersey" in 1819. The legislature enacted "An Act to incorporate the City of Jersey, in the County of Bergen" on January 28, 1820. Under the provision, five freeholders (including Varick, Dey, and Radcliff) were to be chosen as "the Board of Selectmen of Jersey City", thereby establishing the first governing body of the emerging municipality. The city was reincorporated on January 23, 1829, and again on February 22, 1838, at which time it became completely independent of Bergen and was given its present name. On February 22, 1840, Jersey City became part of the newly created Hudson County which separated from Bergen County and annexed the former Essex County land of New Barbadoes Neck.

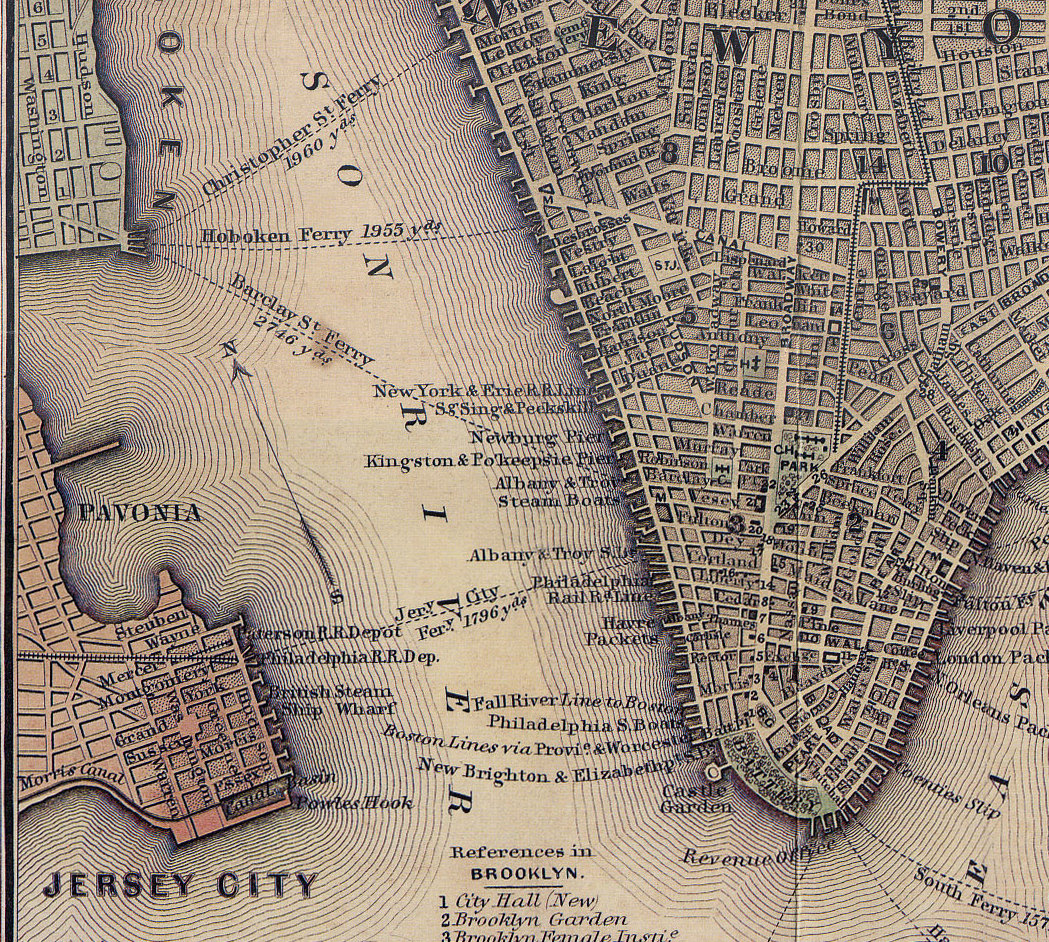
1847 map of Paulus Hook and the Jersey City Ferry's route. Note the historic name of Pavonia.

In 1812, Robert Fulton began steam ferry service via The Jersey between Paulus Hook and Manhattan, eight years after building a shipyard at Greene and Morgan Streets. Isaac Edge opened his waterfront grist windmill in 1815 at Montgomery and Greene Streets. In 1834, the New Jersey Rail Road and Transportation Company opened the city's first rail line from Jersey City Ferry to Newark. From 1834 to 1836, the Morris Canal was extended from Newark to Jersey City and New York Harbor linking the Delaware River with the Hudson River. This extension connected Jersey City to Pennsylvania's Lehigh Valley and New Jersey's interior providing a steady and easy supply of coal and anthracite pig iron for the growing iron industry and other developing industries adopting steam power in Jersey City and the region. The city's location on the Hudson River also allowed it to benefit from the opening of the Erie Canal in 1825.

In 1839, Provident Savings Institution was charted by the state as the first mutual savings bank in New Jersey and the first bank in Jersey City and Hudson County. Co-founded by the city's first mayor, Dudley S. Gregory (1838–1840), in the wake of the Panic of 1837, there was a general mistrust of banks by the public. In response, the bank's charter established it as a "mutual savings bank" to assist the city's immigrant poor. In 1891, the bank headquarters became the temporary home of the first branch of the Jersey City Free Public Library until the Main Library branch opened in 1901.

On April 12, 1841, the New Jersey Legislature incorporated Van Vorst Township from portions of Bergen. Land was donated by the Van Vorst family for a town square style park that became Van Vorst Park. The township was later annexed by Jersey City on March 18, 1851. From 1854 to 1874, the kitchen step of the Van Vorst Mansion, home of former mayor Cornelius Van Vorst (1860–1862), was known to be the slab of marble that was originally the base of the statue of King George III that was toppled by the Sons of Liberty at Bowling Green in Lower Manhattan in 1776. Van Vorst also constructed the neighboring Barrow Mansion where his sister Eliza lived.

By mid century, Jersey City's rapidly urbanizing population began to encounter significant challenges gaining access to freshwater. In 1850, Jersey City Water Works engineer William S. Whitwell, proposed a three-reservoir complex in the Jersey City Heights (then part of North Bergen) connected to a pumping station near the Passaic River in Belleville by a massive underground aqueduct to deliver freshwater to the city. Reservoir No. 1 was built between 1851 and 1854 and Reservoir No. 3 was built between 1871 and 1874 under the direction of engineer John Culver. Reservoir No. 2 was never constructed and later became Pershing Field.

On May 2, 1867, The Evening Journal, was first published. The newspaper was founded by U.S. Army Civil War veterans William Dunning and Z. K. Pangborn at Exchange Place where it would grow and expand into additional buildings. Pangborn went on to serve as the chairman of the 1870 City Charter Commission and was active in city politics. In 1909, editor Joseph A. Dear renamed the paper The Jersey Journal and in 1911 the paper moved to the neighborhood that would later take its name, Journal Square.

In 1868, the Jersey City Board of Alderman took over the pest house and renamed it "Jersey City Charity Hospital" and operated it as a public medical facility, the first in the city and state, where physicians provided free medical care to city residents. In 1885, the hospital expanded to a new 200-bed facility on Bergen Hill to remove the hospital from the increasing industrial development at Paulus Hook.

==== The Underground Railroad ====
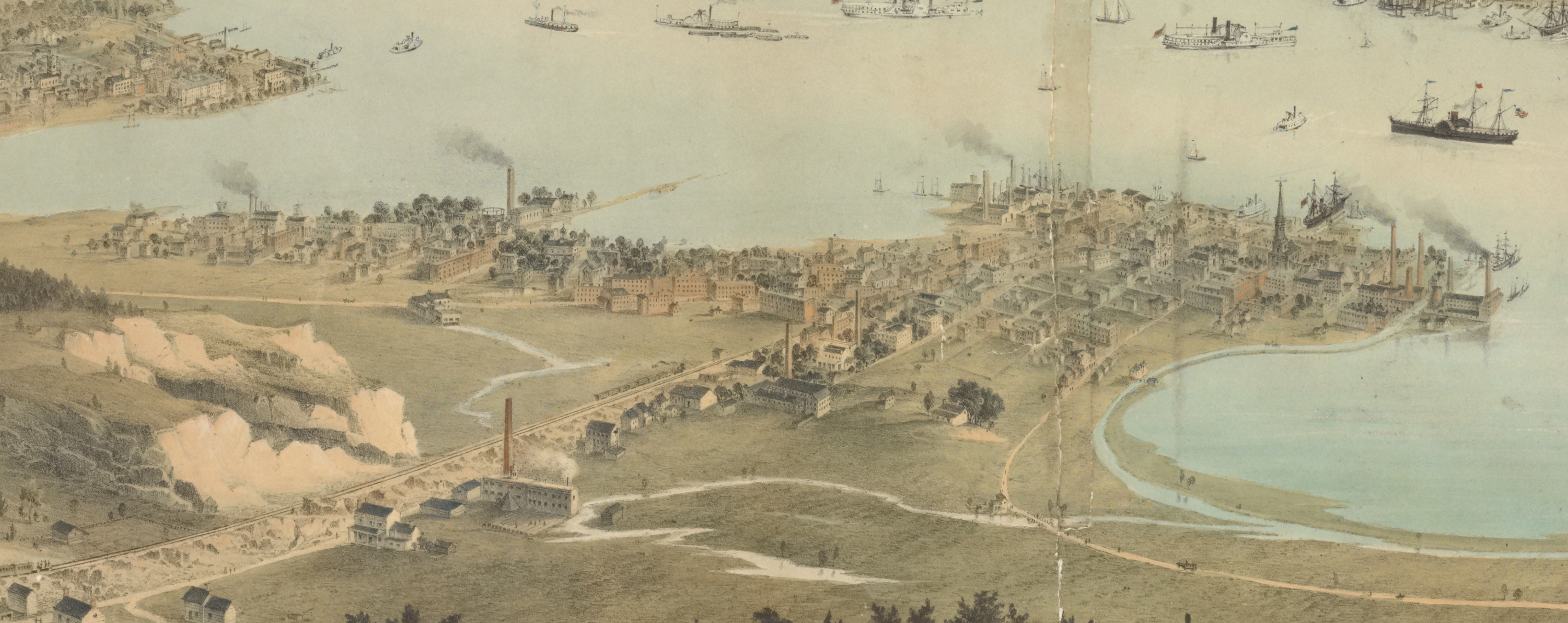
Panorama of Jersey City in 1854

During the 19th century and into the Civil War, former slaves reached Jersey City on one of the four main routes of the Underground Railroad through New Jersey that all converged in the city. On Bergen Hill, the Hilton-Holden House, named after noted abolitionist, astronomer and U.S. Army colonel David Le Cain Holden, was the last "station" for fugitive slaves to stop over and seek refuge before New York and is the last remaining in the city. They would then be hidden in wagons en route to the Jersey City waterfront and Morris Canal Basin where abolitionists would hire ferry and coal boats to transport former slaves up to Canada or New England to freedom. Its estimated that more than 60,000 former slaves traveled through Jersey City including some that decided to stay and make the city their home.

In 1831, brothers Thomas and John Vreeland Jackson, who were former slaves freed by the Vreeland family, bought land in what is now Greenville. In 1857, they laid out Jackson Lane (now Winfield Avenue) between their houses, where during the Civil War, their property became an important station on the Underground Railroad. The city's Jackson Hill neighborhood and Jackson Square are named in their honor.

==== Consolidation of Jersey City ====
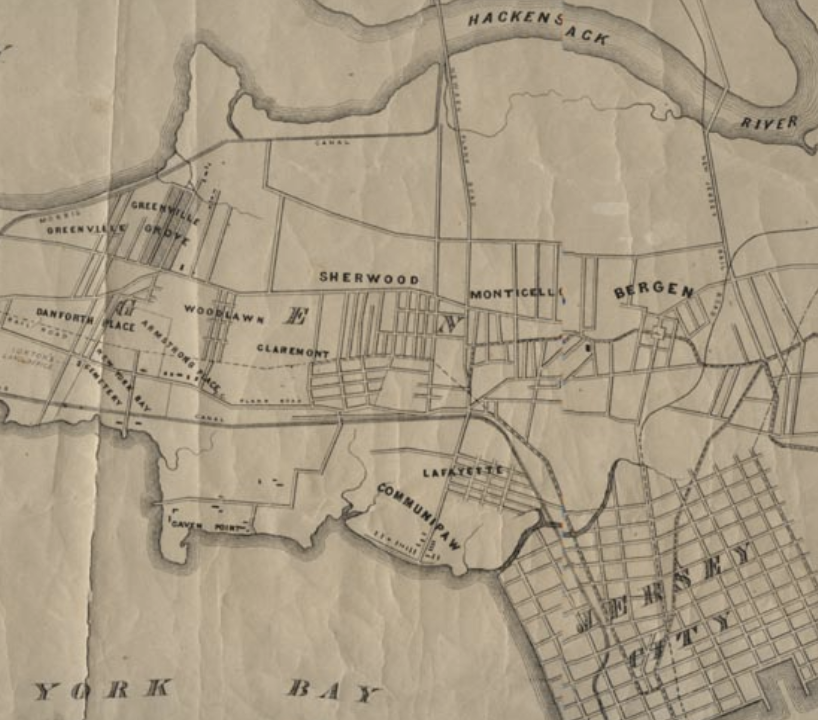
1860 map of Jersey City, Bergen City with Communipaw/Lafayette, and Greenville before consolidation (with each other and Hudson City)

Soon after the Civil War, the idea arose of uniting all of the towns of Hudson County east of the Hackensack River into one municipality. In 1868, a bill for submitting the question of consolidation of all of Hudson County to the voters was presented to the Board of Chosen Freeholders (now known as the Board of County Commissioners). The bill was approved by the state legislature on April 2, 1869, with a special election to be held on October 5, 1869. An element of the bill provided that only contiguous towns could be consolidated. While a majority of the voters across the county approved the merger, the only municipalities that had approved the consolidation plan and that adjoined Jersey City were Hudson City and Bergen City. The consolidation began on March 17, 1870, taking effect on May 3, 1870. Three years later on February 4, 1873, the present outline of Jersey City was completed when Greenville Township agreed to merge into the Greater Jersey City.

Following consolidation, the city's first university, Saint Peter's College, was charted in 1872 and classes began on September 2, 1878, in Paulus Hook. Decades later, it would adopt the peacock as its mascot in partial reference to the original settling of the Jersey City area as "Pavonia", land of the peacock.

On October 28, 1886, the Statue of Liberty was dedicated by President Grover Cleveland just off the city's shores at Bedloe's Island in New York Harbor. In the coming decades, the statue would welcome millions of immigrants as they arrived by ship at Ellis Island, which opened in 1892.

By the late 1880s, three passenger railroad terminals opened in Jersey City along the Hudson River (Pavonia Terminal, Exchange Place and Communipaw) making Jersey City a terminus for the nation's rail network. Tens of millions, roughly two-thirds, of immigrants that were processed at Ellis Island entered the United States through Communipaw Terminal to then settle in Jersey City and its neighboring municipalities or make their way westward. The railroads transformed the city's geography by building several tunnels and cuts, such as the Bergen Arches, through the city and filling in the coves at Harsimus and Communipaw for the construction of several large freight rail yards along the waterfront.

Jersey City became an important port, railroad and manufacturing city during the 19th and 20th centuries. Much like New York City, Jersey City has always been a destination for new immigrants to the United States. German, Russian, Polish, Scottish, Irish and Italian immigrants settled in local tenements and found work at the local docks, railroads and adjacent companies such as American Can, American Sugar, A&P, Colgate, Clorox Co., Lorillard Tobacoo and Dixon Ticonderoga. During this time, concern grew for the social issues of the city's immigrant poor. Cornelia Foster Bradford founded Whittier House in Paulus Hook in 1894 as the first "settlement house" in New Jersey. Whittier House led to several social reforms and city "firsts" such as free kindergarten, a dental clinic, a visiting nurse service, a milk and medical dispensary, diet kitchen for mothers and babies and a playground. Mary Buell Sayles, a settlement resident, wrote The Housing Conditions of Jersey City in 1902 about the lives of immigrants in and around Paulus Hook. In response, mayor Mark M. Fagan (1902–1907, 1913–1917) created the Municipal Sanitary League and opened the city's first public bath house on Coles Street in 1904. That same year, Jersey City native, governor Franklin Murphy (1902–1905), created the first "State Tenement House Commission" and the New Jersey Legislature passed the "Tenement House Act" to mandate statewide housing reform.

=== 20th century ===
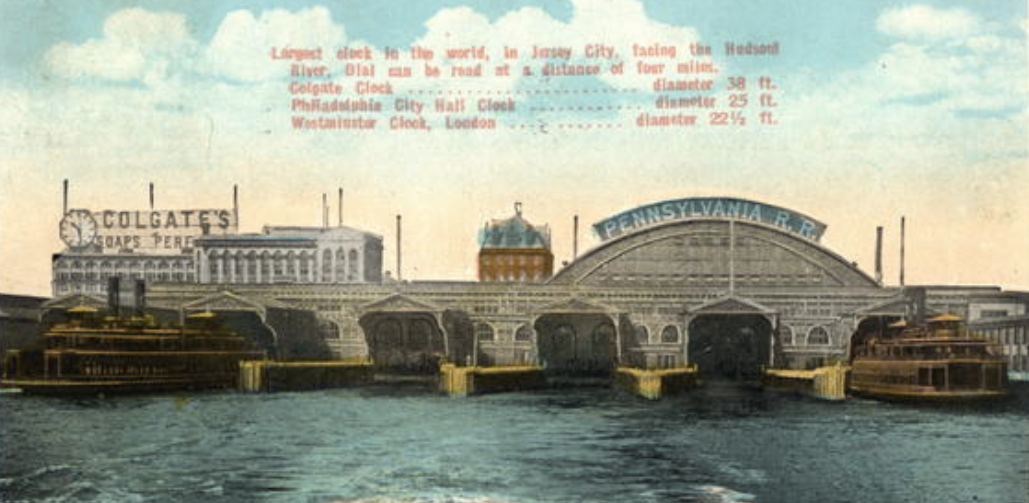
View of Exchange Place from the Hudson, 1920s

By the turn of the 20th century, the City Beautiful movement had spread throughout cities in the United States. Part of its mission was to preserve public space for recreational activities in urban industrial communities. The Hudson County Parks Commission was created in 1892 to plan and develop a county wide park and boulevard system similar to those found in other cities. From 1892 to 1897, Hudson Boulevard (now John F. Kennedy Boulevard) was built to connect the future park system from Bayonne to North Bergen through Jersey City. In 1905, Lincoln Park opened on the city's West Side as the largest park in Jersey City and the first and largest park in the county system. Designed by Daniel W. Langton and Charles N. Lowrie, the 273.4 acres (110.6 ha) park was mostly built on undeveloped wetlands and woodlands known as "Glendale Woods", stretching from the Boulevard to the Hackensack River. The Jersey City government was also inspired by the City Beautiful movement to build more open space creating Dr. Leonard J. Gordon Park in the Heights along Hudson Boulevard, Mary Benson Park in Downtown and Bayside Park in Greenville. The movement also inspired the construction of grand civic buildings in the city such as City Hall and the Hudson County Courthouse.

In 1908, the city's water supply was the first permanent chlorinated disinfection system for drinking water in the United States. Devised by John L. Leal and designed by George W. Fuller, the system was installed at the city's new Boonton Reservoir on the Rockaway River, which replaced the Passaic River as the city's freshwater source in 1904. The Hudson & Manhattan Railroad (now the PATH system) opened between 1908 and 1913 as New Jersey's first underground rapid transit system. For the first time, Jersey City and the rail terminals at Hoboken, Pavonia and Exchange Place were directly linked with Midtown and Lower Manhattan under the Hudson River, providing an alternative to transferring to the extensive ferry system.

In 1910, William L. Dickinson High School opened as the first purpose-built high school in Jersey City. The design of the school, built during the City Beautiful movement, is thought to have been inspired by that of the Louvre Colonnade and Buckingham Palace. The prominent hilltop location of the school has been an important location throughout the city's history. During the Revolutionary War, it was used as a lookout by General Washington and Marquis de Lafayette to observe British movements at the forts at Paulus Hook and in Lower Manhattan. After the start of the War of 1812, the site assisted in defending New York Harbor with an arsenal built on the property's west side and with the east side serving as a troop campground. During the Civil War, the arsenal served as barracks for Union soldiers and a hospital. The school was used as an army training facility during World War I and World War II.

On July 30, 1916, the Black Tom explosion occurred killing 7 people, damaging the Statue of Liberty and causing millions of dollars in damage in Jersey City and throughout the New York metropolitan area. The blast was the equivalent of an earthquake measuring between 5.0 and 5.5 on the Richter scale and was felt as far away as Maryland. The explosion was an act of sabotage on American munitions by German spies of the Office of Naval Intelligence to prevent the ammunition from being shipped to the Allies for use during World War I. This event, coupled with the torpedoing of the RMS Lusitania, which killed 136 Americans in 1915, pushed the United States into entering the War in 1917.

==== Mayor "Boss" Hague ====
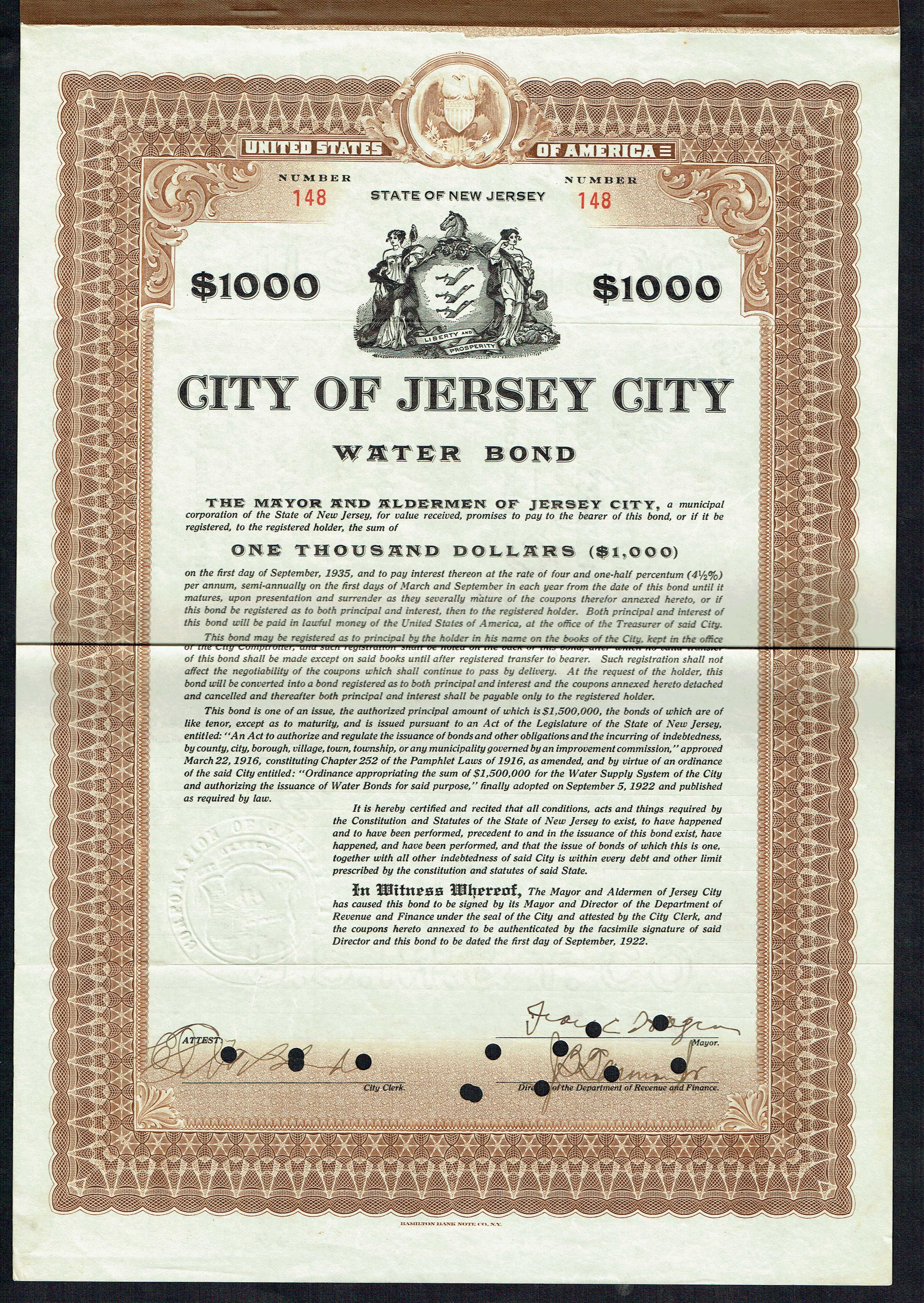
Water bond of the City of Jersey City, issued 1 September 1922, signed by Mayor Frank Hague

From 1917 to 1947, Jersey City was governed by mayor Frank Hague. Originally elected as a candidate supporting reform in governance, his name is "synonymous with the early twentieth century urban American blend of political favoritism and social welfare known as bossism". Hague ran the city with an iron fist while, at the same time, molding governors, United States senators, and judges to his whims while also being a close political ally to Franklin D. Roosevelt. Boss Hague was known to be loud and vulgar, but dressed in a stylish manner, earning him the nickname "King Hanky-Panky". In his later years in office, Hague would often dismiss his enemies as "reds" or "commies". Hague lived like a millionaire, despite having an annual salary that never exceeded $8,500. He was able to maintain a fourteen-room duplex apartment in Jersey City, a suite at the Plaza Hotel in Manhattan, and a palatial summer home in the Jersey Shore community of Deal, and travel to Europe yearly in the royal suites of the best ocean liners.

Hague's time as mayor was also marked by his direct influence in the construction of several important infrastructure, educational, open space, healthcare and public works projects that became functional civic landmarks that define the city to this day. Some of these projects are the construction of Journal Square and its theaters, the Holland Tunnel, the Wittpenn Bridge, the design of New Jersey Route 139, the Pulaski Skyway, Lincoln High School, Snyder High School, A. Harry Moore School, Kean Jersey City, the Heights, Miller and Greenville branches of the library system, Pershing Field, Audubon Park, five public housing complexes, Harborside Terminal, the Seventh Police Precinct and Criminal Court, the expansion of Jersey City Hospital to Jersey City Medical Center, the Jersey City Armory and Roosevelt Stadium. Hague financed several of these projects with WPA funds secured by congresswoman Mary Teresa Norton (1925–1951), the first woman elected to represent New Jersey or any state in the Northeast.

After Hague's retirement from politics, a series of mayors including John V. Kenny (1949–1953), Thomas J. Whelan (1963–1971) and Thomas F. X. Smith (1977–1981) attempted to take control of Hague's organization, usually under the mantle of political reform. None were able to duplicate the level of power held by Hague, but the city and Hudson County remained notorious for political corruption for decades to come.

=== Post-World War II: 1950s–1970s ===
Following World War II, returning veterans created a post-war economic boom and were beginning to buy homes in the suburbs with the assistance of the G.I. Bill. During the Great Depression and the war years, not much new housing was constructed, leaving cities with older and overcrowded housing stock. In response, Jersey City looked to build new housing on undeveloped tracts around the city. College Towers was built on the West Side as the first middle-income housing cooperative apartment complex in New Jersey in 1956. Country Village was built in the 1960s as a middle-income "suburbia-in-the-city" planned community in the Greenville/West Side area to offer the "out of town" experience without leaving the city. The city had hoped that new residential neighborhoods and housing stock would keep the city's population stable.

In 1951, Seton Hall University School of Law opened on the site of the former John Marshall Law School at 40 Journal Square and would relocate to Newark by the end of the year. From 1956 to 1968, Jersey City Medical Center was the home of the Seton Hall College of Medicine and Dentistry, the predecessor to the University of Medicine and Dentistry of New Jersey (UMDNJ), which would relocate to Newark in 1969.

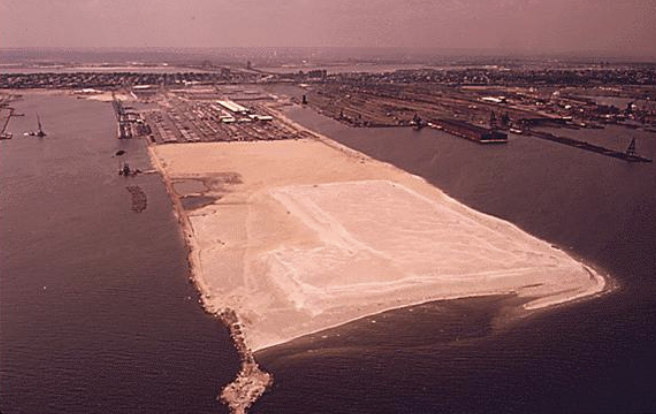
Landfill adjacent to Greenville Yards in 1974 that would become part of Port Jersey

In 1956, the Newark Bay (Hudson County) Extension Interstate 78 of the New Jersey Turnpike opened. As the first limited-access section of Interstate 78 to be built in the state, the extension connected Jersey City and the Holland Tunnel to the mainline of the Turnpike in Newark via the Newark Bay Bridge and at an estimated cost of $2,765 per foot, it was deemed the "world's most expensive road". That same year, the standard shipping container debuted along with the maiden voyage of the container ship SS Ideal X from Port Newark to the Port of Houston. These innovations changed forever the way the maritime industry shipped goods by sea and led to the transformation of Port Newark into the leading container port in New York Harbor. As a result, the Jersey City waterfront, along with the other traditional waterfront port facilities in the harbor at Hoboken, Manhattan and Brooklyn, quickly became antiquated and fell into a steep decline. Additionally, by the late 1960s, the rail terminals and associated ferry service that were so vital to the city's economic health had closed and were later abandoned after the host railroads declared bankruptcy. In response to adapt to this economic shift, Port Jersey was created on Upper New York Bay adjacent to Greenville Yard between 1972 and 1976 as the city's own modern intermodal freight transport facility and container shipping terminal.

In 1964, the Hudson County Boulevard Commission planned to apply for federal funds to upgrade Kennedy Boulevard that would require the Boulevard be converted into a major highway by widening the roadway, cutting down trees and removing sidewalks. The Jersey City Junior Woman's Club, led by future New Jersey assemblywoman, Joan M. Quigley, protested daily and formed the "Save Our Boulevard" committee. The protests culminated in 30 Club members playing cards in the middle of the Boulevard blocking traffic resulting in the arrests of four members. The fallout from the protests and arrests forced county officials to abandon the pursuit of federal funds, disband the Commission and led to a ban on truck traffic from the Boulevard.

From August 2 to 5 1964, race riots occurred in the predominantly African American neighborhood of Lafayette in the Bergen-Lafaytte section of the city. The riots began on August 2 when a young black woman, Delores Shannon, was arrested for disorderly conduct and Arthur Mays, brother of future Olympian, city councilman and state assemblyman, Charles Mays, was arrested for intervening at the Lafayette Gardens public housing complex. Clashes between police and black residents occurred over the next three days. On August 3, mayor Thomas J. Whelan met with local leaders and clergymen and the leadership of the Congress of Racial Equality and the NAACP to discuss how to address the inequities in the African American community and how to end the civil unrest. By the end of the riots on August 5, at least 46 people had been injured, 52 people were arrested and 71 stores and businesses were damaged.

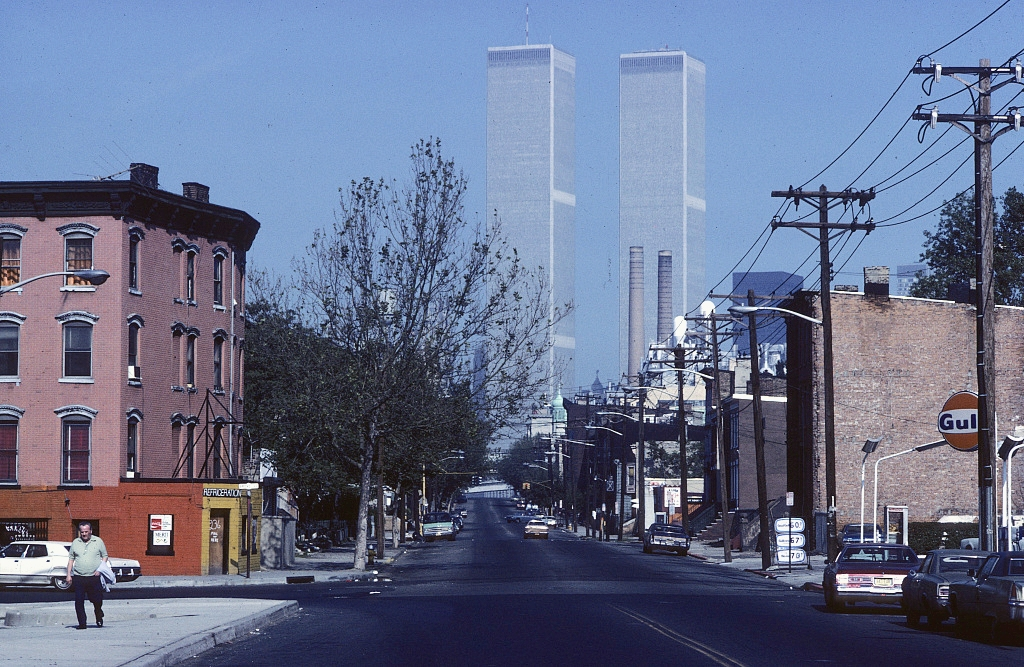
World Trade Center from the intersection of Grove St. and Grand St. in 1978

By the 1970s, Jersey City was in a period of urban decline spurred on by deindustrialization. Many of its former industrial anchors relocated or declared bankruptcy which led many of the city's wealthy residents to leave for the suburbs due to rising crime, civil unrest, political corruption, and economic hardship. From 1950 to 1980, Jersey City lost 75,000 residents, and from 1975 to 1982, the city lost 5,000 jobs, or 9% of its workforce.

In 1974, Hudson County Community College was established in Journal Square as one of two "contract" colleges in the United States and the first contract college in New Jersey to grant students occupational and career-oriented certificates and Associates in Applied Science degrees. Since then, the college has grown throughout the Journal Square and Bergen Square neighborhoods.

On Feb. 19, 1974, the city council voted 8–1 to repeal a 40-year-old law that banned women from drinking at bars and working as bartenders. It was signed into law in 1934 by mayor Frank Hague when the end of Prohibition led to new alcohol regulations. The law stated that "no women to be served in a barroom" and "no female bartenders." Jersey City councilwoman Lois Shaw launched the movement for repeal when she and a group of women ordered a round of drinks to "liberate" the Majestic Tavern across the street from City Hall.

On Flag Day 1976, Liberty State Park opened on New York Harbor to coincide with the nation's bicentennial. At 1,212 acres (490.5 ha) with a two-mile waterfront walkway, it is the largest park in Jersey City and the largest urban park in New Jersey. The park was built on the site of the former railyards of the Central Railroad of New Jersey and Lehigh Valley Railroad. The idea for the park dated back to the late 1950s and its creation was advocated for and spearheaded by several Jersey City residents: Audrey Zapp, Theodore Conrad, Morris Pesin and J. Owen Grundy. Jersey City donated 156 acres (63.1 ha) of land to the development of the park through their advocacy. The Liberty Science Center opened in the park in 1993.

=== Late 20th and early 21st centuries ===
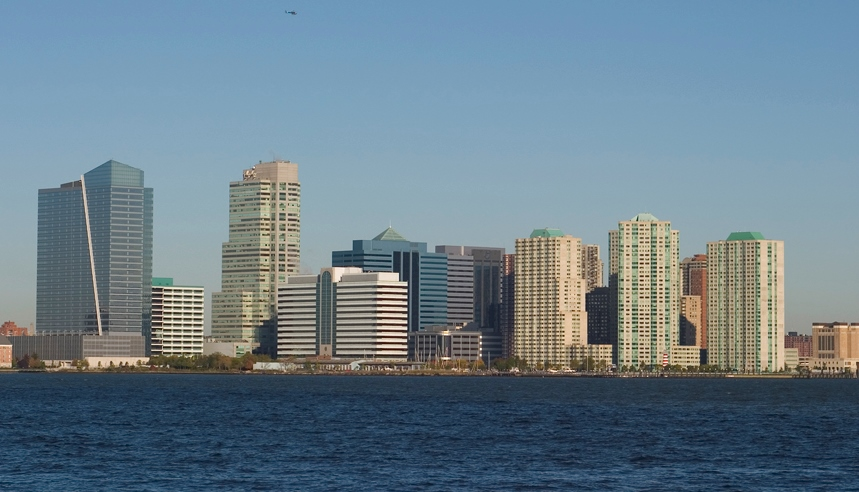
Newport section of the Jersey City skyline along the Hudson River

Beginning in the 1980s, the restoration of brownstones in neighborhoods such as Paulus Hook, Van Vorst Park, Hamilton Park, Harsimus Cove and Bergen Hill, along with artists repurposing warehouses in the Powerhouse Arts District and redevelopment of the waterfront previously occupied by railyards, factories and warehouses helped spark Jersey City's economic renaissance. From 1995 to 2003, Jersey City led the 100 largest cities in the United States in job growth and poverty reduction. The rapid construction of numerous high-rise buildings, such as the mixed-use community of Newport, increased the population and led to the development of the Exchange Place financial district, also known as "Wall Street West", one of the largest financial centers in the United States. Financial institutions such as UBS, Goldman Sachs, Chase Bank, Citibank, and Merrill Lynch occupy prominent buildings on the Jersey City waterfront, some of which are among the tallest buildings in New Jersey. With 18,000,000 square feet (1,700,000 m^{2}) of office space as of 2011, Jersey City has the nation's 12th-largest downtown and the state's largest office market.

Since 1988, the New Jersey Department of Environmental Protection has mandated by law that developers building along the waterfront in Hudson County preserve and develop the Hudson River Waterfront Walkway to provide the public with access and recreation by creating a linear park along the Hudson River. The walkway through Jersey City is substantially complete and runs from Hoboken Terminal through Liberty State Park to Port Liberté.

Simultaneous to this building boom, new transit projects were prioritized. By the late 1980s, trans-Hudson ferry service was restored along the waterfront by NY Waterway with ferry terminals now at Paulus Hook, Liberty Harbor and Port Liberté. From 1996 to 2011, NJ Transit constructed the Hudson-Bergen Light Rail as one of the largest public works projects in state history. The system was developed and extended throughout the city and its Downtown utilizing the former right-of-ways of the railroads that defined the city and county during the 19th and early 20th centuries. The system links Jersey City with its neighboring cities while connecting to several NJ Transit bus and rail lines, PATH stations and ferry terminals.

==== September 11, 2001 ====
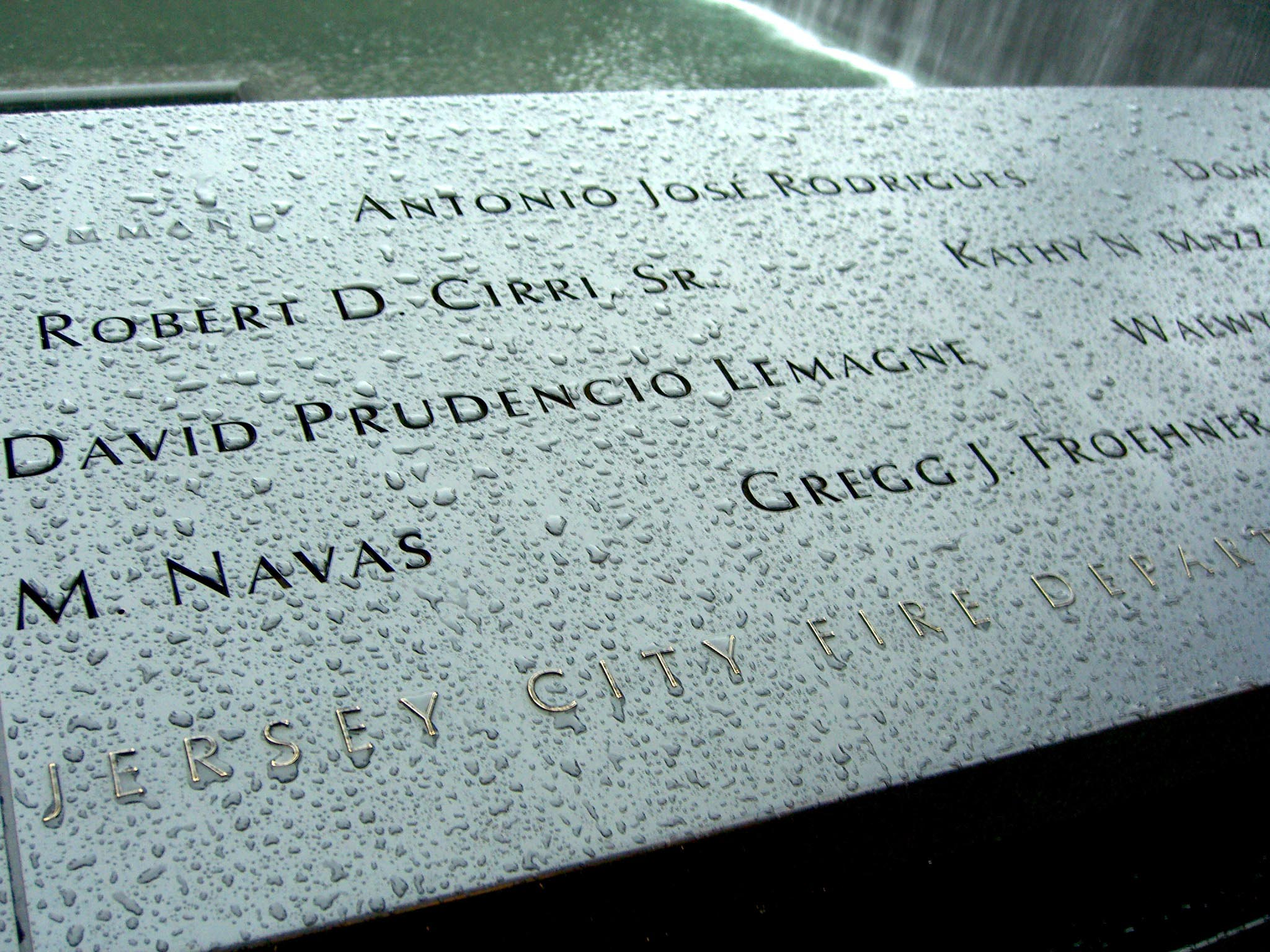
Panel S-29 on the South Pool of the National 9/11 Memorial honors the JCFD.

Jersey City was directly affected by the September 11, 2001 attacks at the World Trade Center where 38 city residents lost their lives. One of the 38 victims was Joseph Lovero, a Jersey City Fire Department dispatcher, who was killed by a piece of falling debris while responding. The Jersey City Fire Department was the only New Jersey fire department to receive an official call for assistance from the FDNY. Following the attacks, the Jersey City waterfront became the largest triage center in the area for survivors escaping Lower Manhattan by ferry during the "9/11 Boatlift". In the days and weeks after, Jersey City became a staging area for rescue and aid workers headed to "Ground Zero" for rescue and recovery efforts. The collapse of the Twin Towers destroyed the World Trade Center PATH station and the firefighting efforts flooded the Downtown Hudson River tunnels and the Exchange Place PATH station severing the rail connection between Jersey City and Lower Manhattan until 2003. Over the years several memorials have been erected along the waterfront including the Jersey City 9/11 Memorial and the official New Jersey state memorial Empty Sky.

On November 19, 2015, while campaigning for president in Birmingham, Alabama, Donald Trump falsely claimed a conspiracy theory that he witnessed "thousands of people" celebrating the attacks in Jersey City on television. Trump continued to repeat the conspiracy theory to multiple news outlets for weeks, later adding that the people were Muslims, despite no confirmed reports, evidence or footage from that time being found to confirm his repeated falsehood. In response, the Jersey City council proposed a measure to persuade the condo association at Trump Plaza Jersey City to remove Trump's name off of the building marquee. Both Trump Plaza and Trump Bay Street were later renamed in 2020.

=== 2010s–present ===
In August 2011, several areas of Downtown Jersey City and the waterfront were affected by Hurricane Irene causing severe flooding from the associated storm surge.

Over a year later, Jersey City was heavily impacted by Hurricane Sandy in October 2012 with extended power outages for multiple days, severe wind damage in several neighborhoods and extensive storm surge flooding throughout the city especially in Downtown, the Country Village neighborhood, the West Side and Liberty State Park. The flooding damaged the city's utility infrastructure and led to a days long shutdown of the PATH system, both of its Hudson River tunnels and the Holland Tunnel. For weeks after, the Jersey City Armory served as an emergency shelter for hundreds of displaced city residents. Prior to the storm, homeless individuals went to the armory for refuge. The 108th Wing of the New Jersey Air National Guard from Joint Base McGuire-Dix-Lakehurst provided services such as sleeping cots, shower locations, food and security.

In October 2013, City Ordinance 13.097 passed requiring employers with ten or more employees to offer up to five paid sick days a year. The bill impacts an estimated 30,000 workers at all businesses who employ workers who work at least 80 hours a calendar year in Jersey City. The passage of the ordinance made Jersey City the first municipality in New Jersey and the sixth in the United States to guarantee paid sick leave.

In 2014, Jersey City's Census-estimated population was 262,146, with the largest population increase of any municipality in New Jersey since 2010, representing an increase of 5.9% from the 2010 U.S. census, when the city's population was 247,597.

In 2016, Jersey City raised the minimum wage for its municipal employees to US$15 per hour, double the previous rate, becoming the first municipality in New Jersey to do so. The city's new minimum wage made it several dollars higher than the State ($12 per hour) and Federal ($11 per hour) minimum wages. In 2021, the city raised the minimum wage further to $17 per hour and again in 2022 to $20 per hour.

From 2018 to 2023, Jersey City built a new municipal complex called Jackson Square in the Jackson Hill section of the Bergen-Lafayette neighborhood. Planned since 2014, the city had previously rented office space throughout the city for its multiple agencies. The complex is made up of a City Hall Annex for several agencies, parking garage and public safety headquarters for the Jersey City Police and Fire Departments.

On December 10, 2019, two individuals shot and killed 4 people, including a Jersey City Police Department detective, and injured 3 as part of a domestic terrorist attack at a kosher grocery store in the city's Greenville neighborhood. The shooting was part of a wave of violent attacks against Jews in the United States in 2019.

==== COVID-19 pandemic ====
On March 13, 2020, the first case of COVID-19 was confirmed in Jersey City. The day before, Jersey City was the first city in the state to implement mandatory restrictions to curb the spread of the virus. These restrictions included a nightly curfew on city bars and restaurants and the cancellation of all public meetings, non-essential city-sponsored events and private events held on city property. With its population density and connections to New York City, by early April, Jersey City became the state epicenter for the virus having more cases than any other municipality in New Jersey. Through March 2023, Jersey City recorded 320 deaths, or 120.5 people for every 100,000 residents, from COVID-19 related complications. In April 2023, Jersey City Medical Center dedicated a public serenity garden and stained glass artwork titled Healing and Hope to honor the hospital's COVID-19 emergency response, front line workers and those who died from the pandemic.

== Geography ==
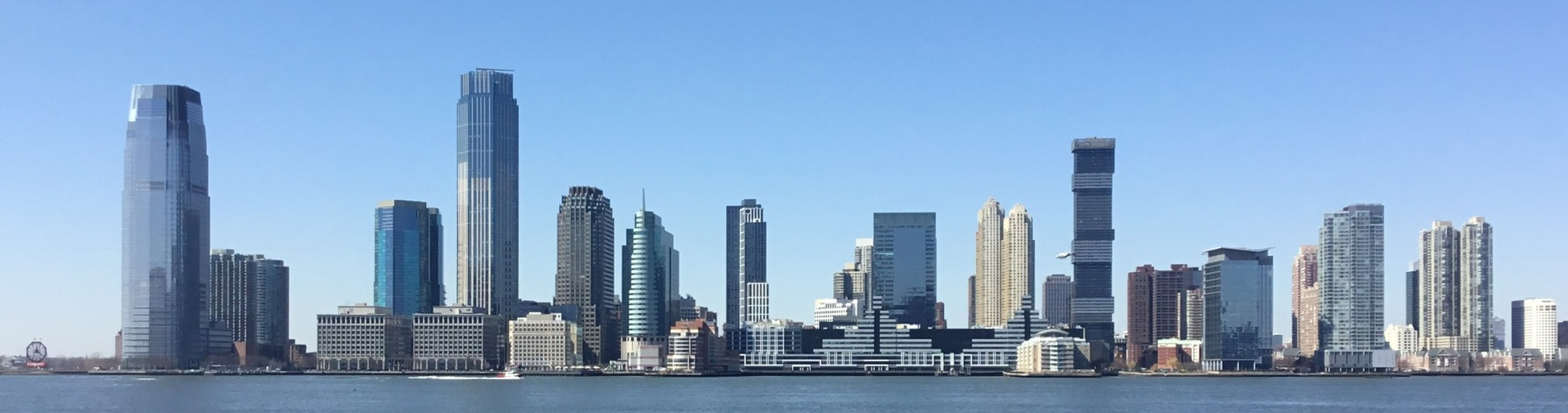
Jersey City Panorama from Downtown Manhattan, March 2023

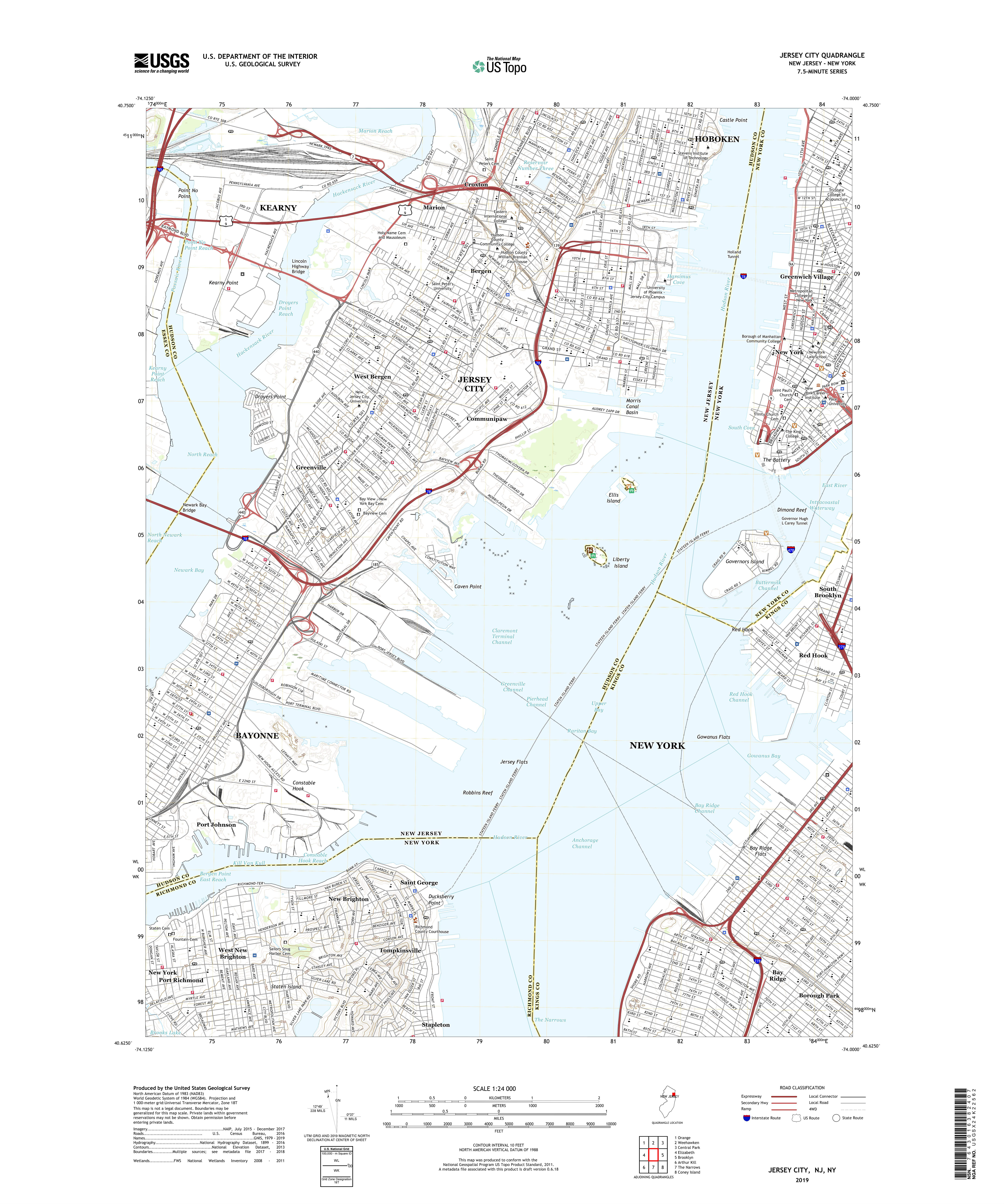
Map of Jersey City area, from United States Geological Survey (USGS)

Jersey City is the seat of Hudson County and the second-most-populous city in New Jersey. According to the United States Census Bureau, the city had a total area of 21.13 square miles (54.74 km^{2}), including 14.74 square miles (38.19 km^{2}) of land and 6.39 square miles (16.55 km^{2}) of water (30.24%). As of the 1990 census, it had the smallest land area of the 100 most populous cities in the United States.

The city is bordered to the east across the Hudson River and Upper New York Bay by Manhattan and Brooklyn in New York State, to the north by Secaucus, North Bergen, Union City and Hoboken, to the west across the Hackensack River and Newark Bay by Kearny and Newark, and to the south by Bayonne.

Jersey City includes most of Ellis Island (the parts awarded to New Jersey by the 1998 U.S. Supreme Court in the case of New Jersey v. New York). Liberty Island is surrounded by Jersey City waters in the Upper New York Bay. Given its proximity and various mass transit connections to Manhattan, Jersey City (along with Hudson County as a whole) is sometimes referred to as New York City's sixth borough.

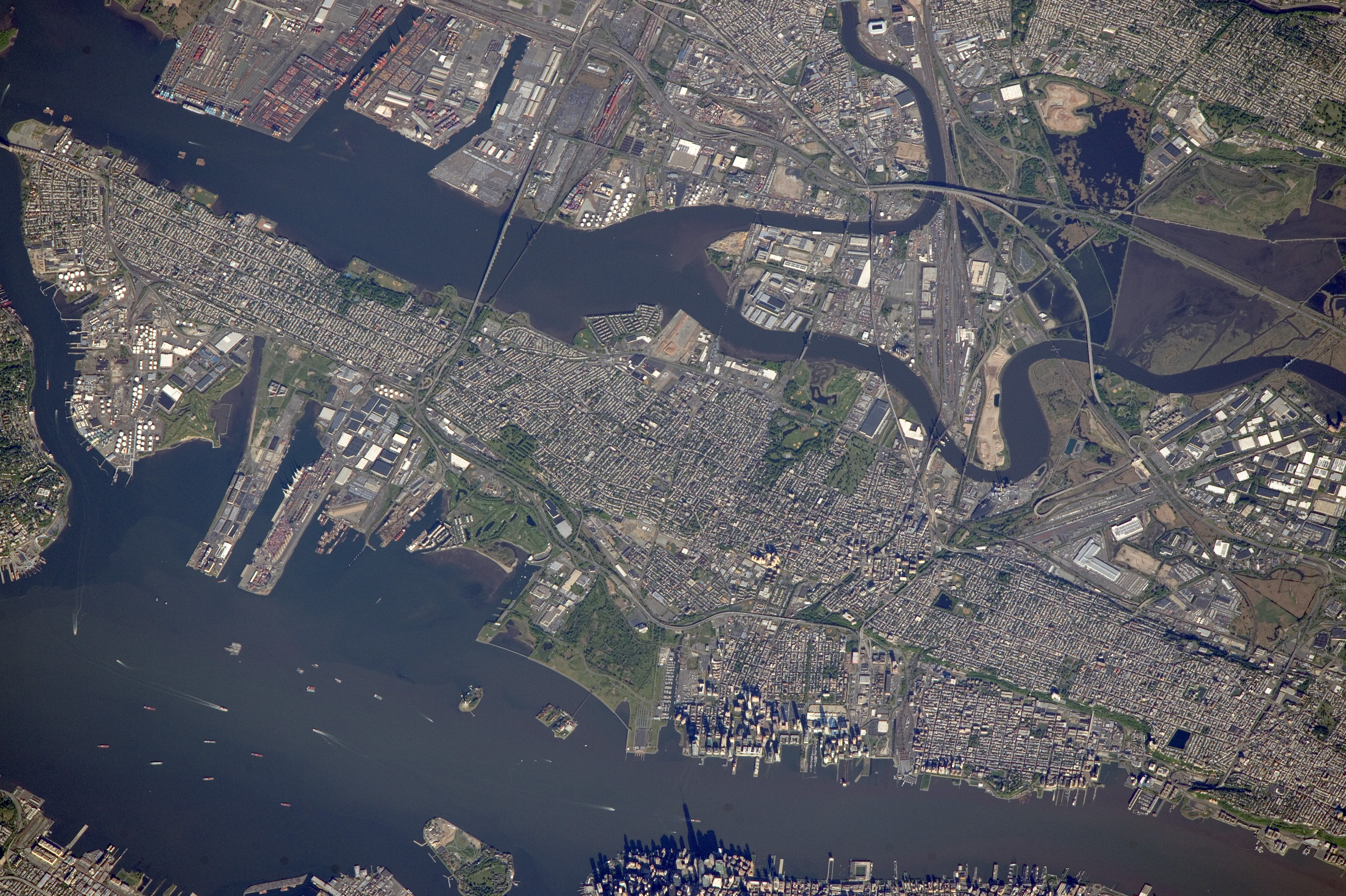
Satellite view of Jersey City

Jersey City (and most of Hudson County) is located on the peninsula known as Bergen Neck, with a waterfront on the east at the Hudson River and New York Bay and on the west at the Hackensack River and Newark Bay. Its north–south axis corresponds with the ridge of Bergen Hill, the emergence of the Hudson Palisades. The city is the site of some of the earliest European settlements in North America, which grew into each other rather than expanding from a central point. This growth and the topography greatly influenced the development of the sections of the city and its various neighborhoods.

=== Climate ===
According to the Köppen climate classification system, Jersey City has a humid subtropical climate (Cfa) closely bordering on a humid continental climate (Dfa) similar to its parallel cities like Newark and New York City. With partial shielding from the Appalachian Mountains and moderating influences from the Atlantic Ocean, the climate in this area is characterized by hot, humid summers and generally cool to cold winters with moderate snowfall. Average temperatures in Jersey City range from a low of 27 °F (−3 °C) in January to a high of 84 °F (29 °C) in July. A record low of −15 °F (−26 °C) was recorded in February 1934 and a record high of 106 °F (41 °C) was recorded in July 1936. Average monthly precipitation ranges from 3.21 in (82 mm) in February to 4.60 in (117 mm) in July. Jersey City lies in the USDA plant hardiness zone 7b.

Jersey City

Climate chart (precipitation, max. and min. temperature)
| J | F | M | A | M | J | J | A | S | O | N | D |
| 3.7 38 27 | 3.2 42 29 | 4.4 50 35 | 4.5 61 45 | 4.2 71 54 | 4.4 79 64 | 4.6 84 69 | 4.4 83 68 | 4.3 75 61 | 4.4 64 50 | 4 54 42 | 4 43 32 |
- █ Average max. and min. temperatures in °F
- █ Precipitation totals in inches
- Source: The Weather Channel
Metric conversion
| J | F | M | A | M | J | J | A | S | O | N | D |
| 93 3 −3 | 82 6 −2 | 111 10 2 | 114 16 7 | 106 22 12 | 112 26 18 | 117 29 21 | 113 28 20 | 109 24 16 | 112 18 10 | 102 12 6 | 102 6 0 |
- █ Average max. and min. temperatures in °C
- █ Precipitation totals in mm

=== Neighborhoods ===
The city is divided into six wards.

==== Bergen-Lafayette ====
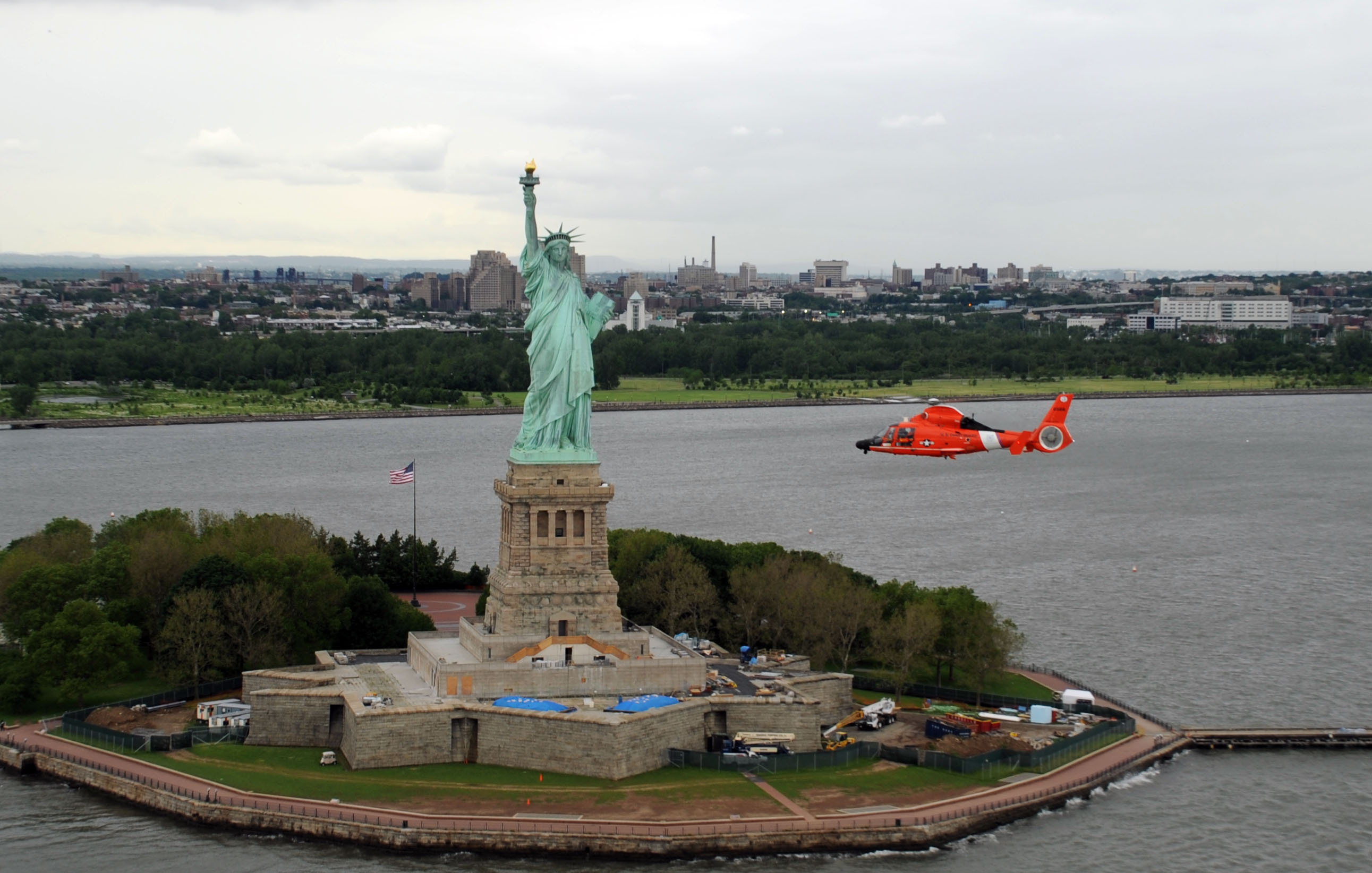
Liberty Island and Liberty State Park

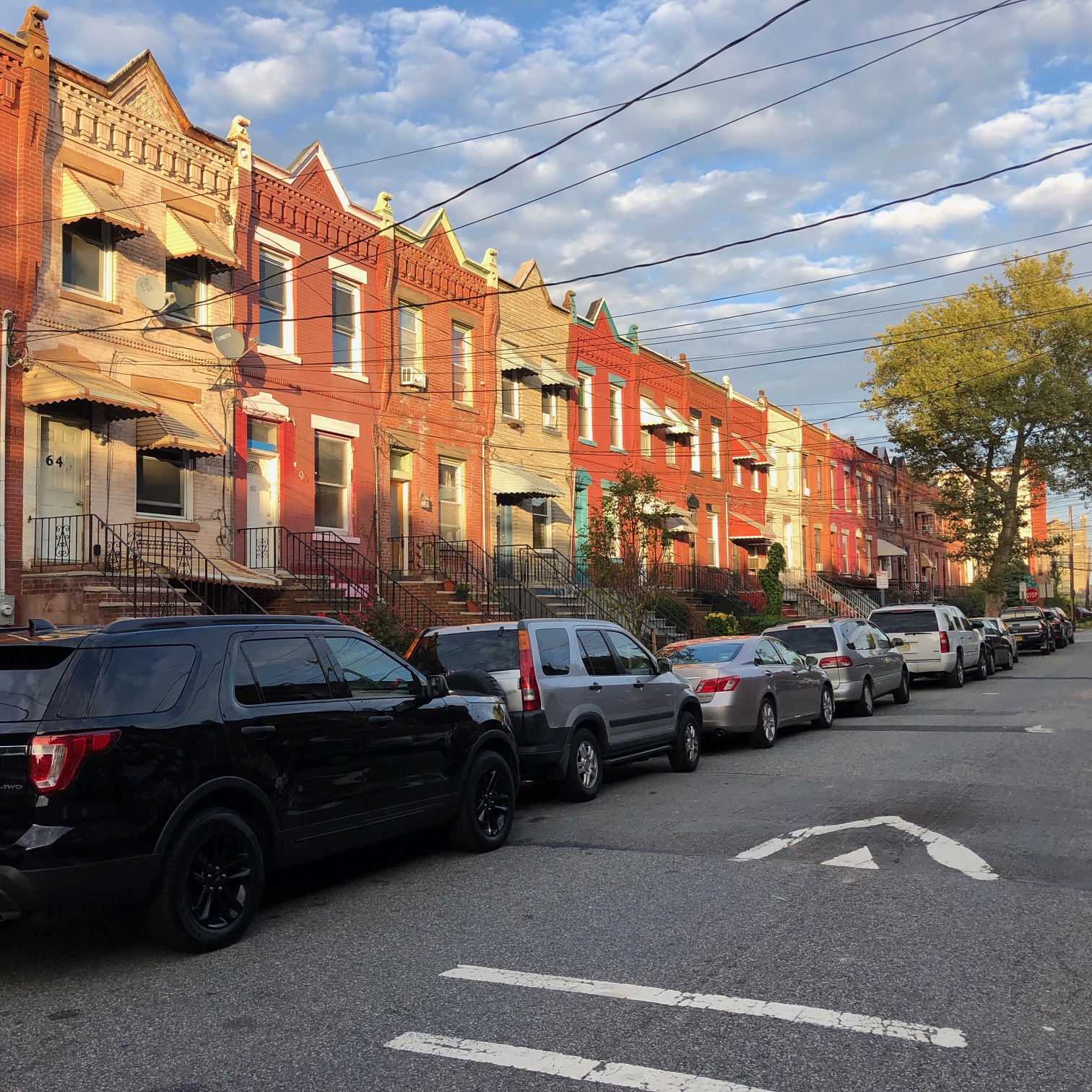
Astor Place on Bergen Hill

Bergen-Lafayette, formerly Bergen City, New Jersey, lies between Greenville to the south and McGinley Square to the north, while bordering Liberty State Park and Downtown to the east and the West Side neighborhood to the west. Communipaw Avenue, Bergen Avenue, Martin Luther King Drive, and Ocean Avenue are main thoroughfares. Library Hall, built in 1866, served as the town hall for Bergen Township, then later as Bergen City, before its annexation. Library Hall has been preserved and is now a residential building. The former Jersey City Medical Center complex, a cluster of Art Deco buildings on a rise in the center of the city, has been converted into residential complexes called The Beacon. Completed in 2016 at a cost of $38 million (~$49.9 million in 2025), Berry Lane Park is located along Garfield Avenue in the northern section of Bergen-Lafayette; covering 17.5 acres (7.1 ha), it is the largest municipal park in Jersey City. The Jersey City Municipal Complex opened in phases at Jackson Square in the Jackson Hill neighborhood from 2018 to 2023.

==== Downtown Jersey City ====
Downtown Jersey City is the area from the Hudson River westward to the Newark Bay Extension of the New Jersey Turnpike (Interstate 78) and the New Jersey Palisades; it is also bounded by Hoboken to the north and Liberty State Park to the south.

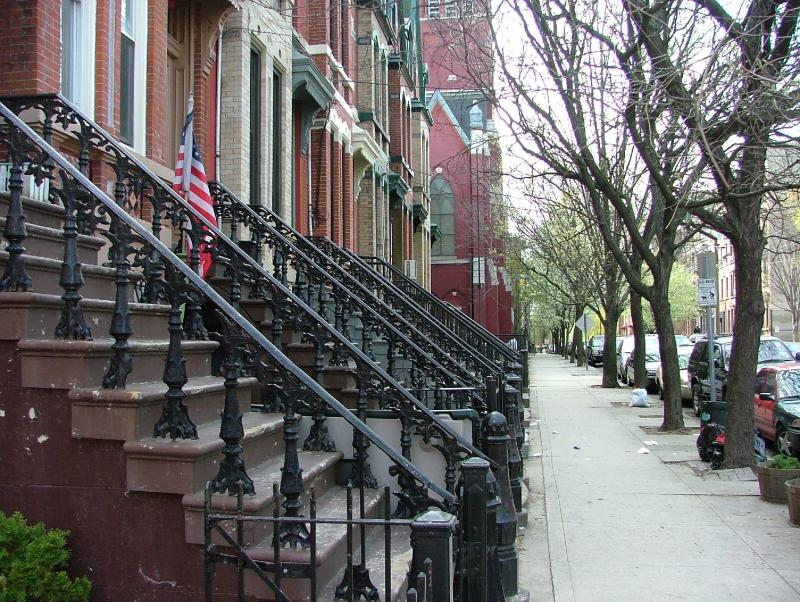
Brownstones in Van Vorst Park neighborhood

Historic Downtown is an area of mostly low-rise buildings to the west of the waterfront that is highly desirable due to its proximity to local amenities and Manhattan. It includes the neighborhoods of Van Vorst Park and Hamilton Park, which are both square parks surrounded by brownstones. This historic downtown also includes Paulus Hook, the Village and Harsimus Cove neighborhoods. Newark Avenue & Grove Street, are the main thoroughfares in Downtown Jersey City, both have seen a lot of development and the surrounding neighborhoods have many stores and restaurants. The Grove Street PATH station has been renovated and made fully ADA compliant. and a number of new residential buildings are being built around the stop, including a 50-story building at 90 Columbus. Historic Downtown is home to many cultural attractions including the Jersey City Museum, the Hudson and Manhattan Railroad Powerhouse (planned to become a museum and artist housing), which gives its name to the Powerhouse Arts Warehouse District, and the Harsimus Stem Embankment along Sixth Street, which a citizens' movement is working to turn into public parkland that would be modeled after the High Line in Manhattan.

Newport and Exchange Place are redeveloped waterfront areas consisting mostly of residential towers, hotels and office buildings that are among the tallest buildings in the city. Newport is a planned mixed-use community, built on the old Erie Lackawanna Railway yards, made up of residential rental towers, condominiums, office buildings, a marina, schools, restaurants, hotels, Newport Centre Mall, a waterfront walkway, transportation facilities, and on-site parking for more than 15,000 vehicles. Newport had a hand in the renaissance of Jersey City although, before ground was broken, much of the downtown area had already begun a steady climb (much like Hoboken).

==== The Heights ====
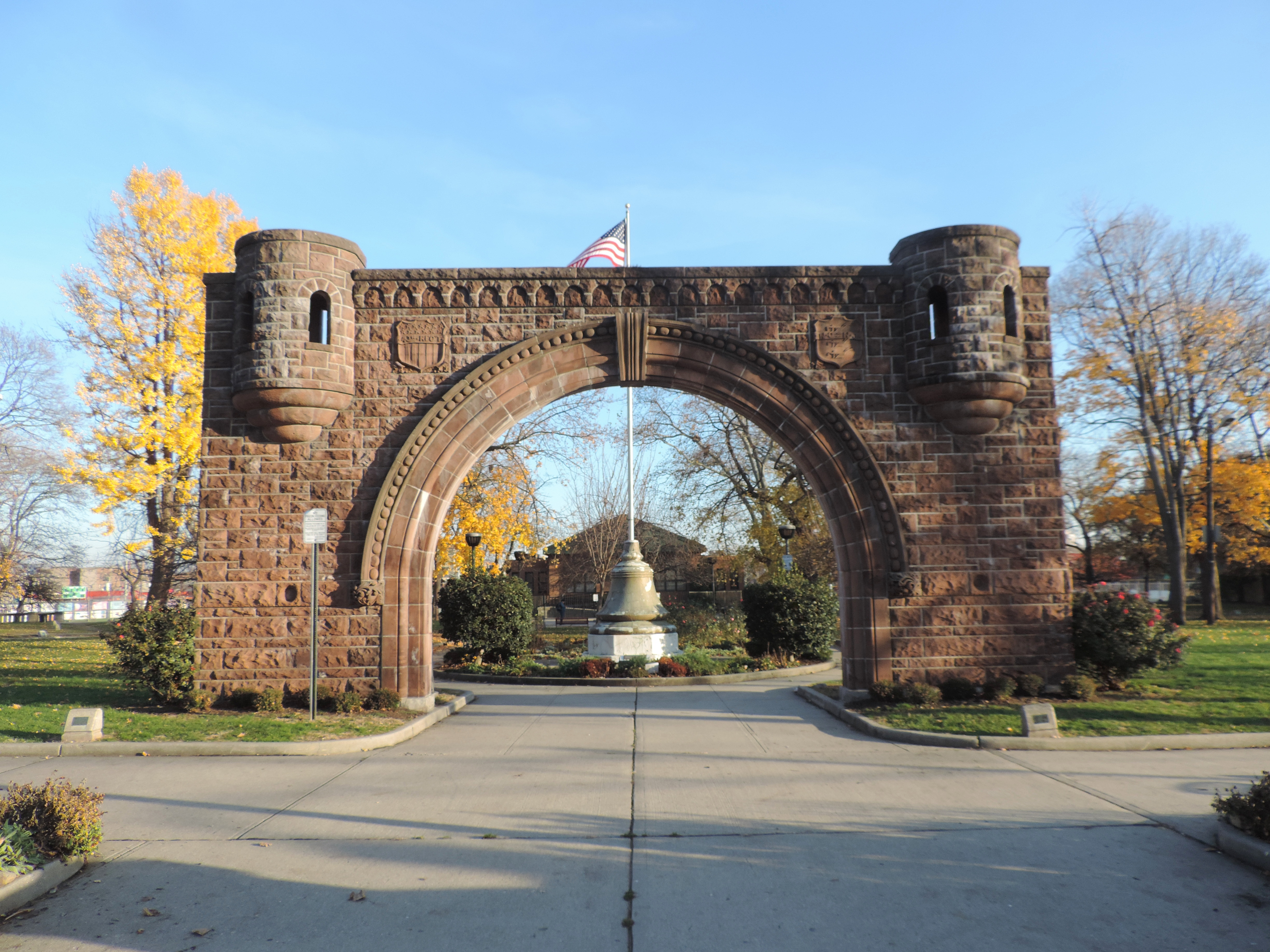
Pershing Field entrance in The Heights

The Heights or Jersey City Heights is a district in the north end of Jersey City atop the New Jersey Palisades overlooking Hoboken to the east and Croxton in the Meadowlands to the west. Previously the city of Hudson City, The Heights was incorporated into Jersey City in 1869. The southern border of The Heights is generally considered to be north of Bergen Arches and the Covered Roadway, while Paterson Plank Road in Washington Park is its main northern boundary. Transfer Station is just over the city line. Its postal area ZIP Code is 07307. The Heights mostly contains two- and three-family houses and low rise apartment buildings, and is similar to North Hudson architectural style and neighborhood character.

==== Journal Square ====
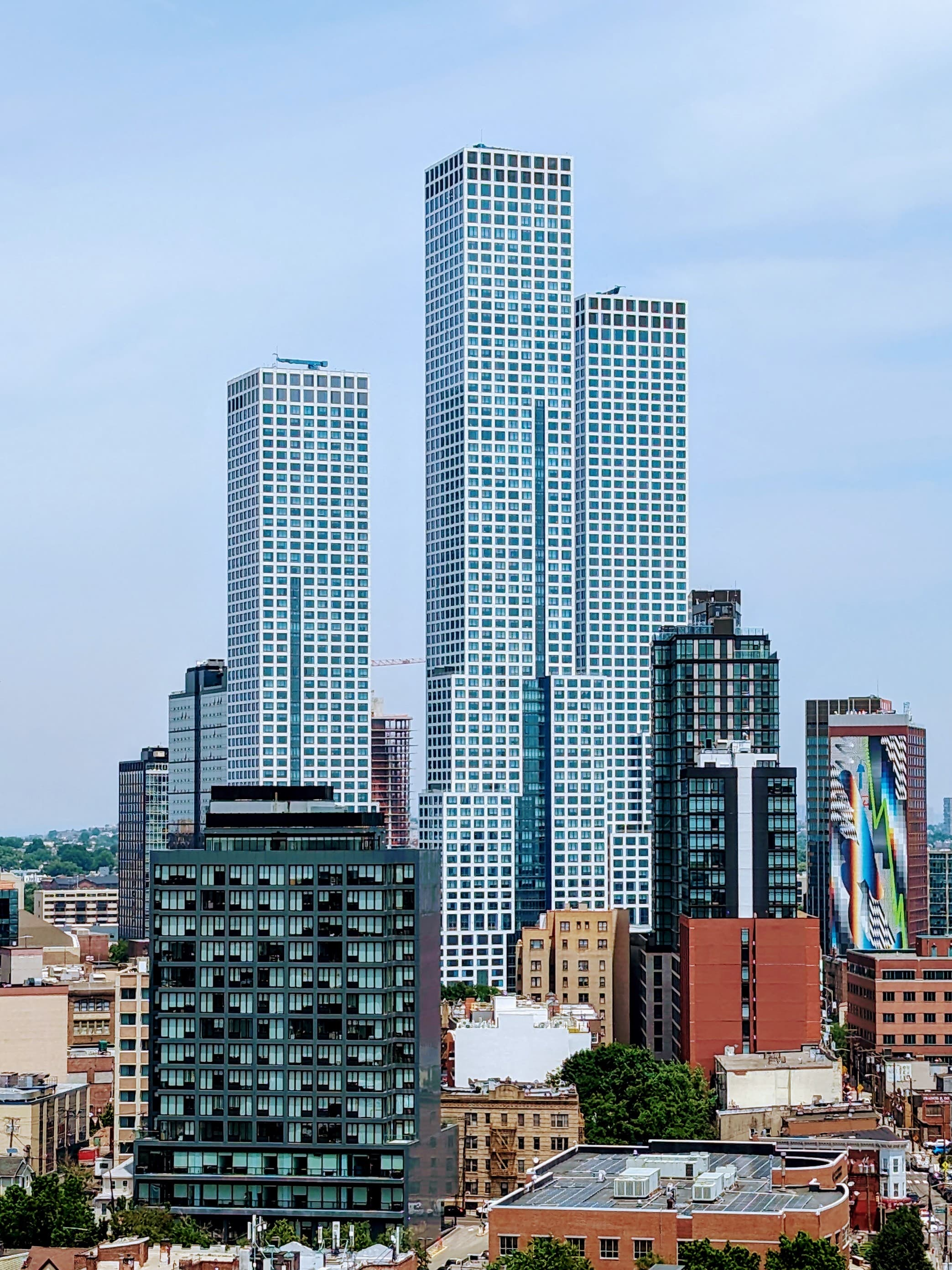
Journal Square residential towers in 2024

Journal Square is a mixed-use central business district. The square was created in 1923, creating a broad intersection with Hudson Boulevard which itself had been widened in 1908. Other major squares in the neighborhood are Bergen Square, India Square and Five Corners. McGinley Square is located in close proximity to Journal Square, and is considered an extension of it. The Journal Square Transportation Center is a major multi-modal transportation hub with a NJ Transit bus terminal and PATH station. It also houses the PATH Operations Center and a multilevel retail plaza. Hudson County Community College is located throughout the neighborhood. Journal Square is currently undergoing a massive wave of economic growth and development not seen since the neighborhood was first established with more than 4,400 residential units under construction.

==== Greenville ====
Greenville is on the south end of Jersey City. In the 2010s, the neighborhood underwent a revitalization. Considered an affordable neighborhood in the New York City area, a number of strictly Orthodox Jews and young families purchased homes and built a substantial community there, attracted by housing that costs less than half of comparable homes in New York City. In a December 2019 shooting incident, three bystanders were killed in a kosher market in Greenville. The two assailants, who had earlier killed a police detective, were also shot and killed.

==== West Side ====
The West Side borders Greenville to the south and the Hackensack River to the west; it is also bounded to the east and north by Bergen-Lafayette and the broader Journal Square area, including McGinley Square. It consists of various diverse areas on both sides of West Side Avenue, one of Jersey City's leading shopping streets. The Hudson-Bergen Light Rail's (HBLR) West Side Avenue station serves the shopping district and surrounding neighborhood. The West Side is the home of Kean Jersey City and Saint Peter's University. The Bayfront project is a planned 100-acre (0.40 km^{2}) mixed-use development and community on a remediated former industrial brownfield site on the Hackensack River. When complete, it will feature 8,000 new housing units with 35% deemed affordable, 23-acre (0.093 km^{2}) of open space, a new school, firehouse and a new HBLR station.

== Demographics ==
Historical population
| Census | Pop. | Note | %± |
|---|---|---|---|
| 1840 | 3,072 | | — |
| 1850 | 6,856 | | 123.2% |
| 1860 | 29,226 | | 326.3% |
| 1870 | 82,546 | * | 182.4% |
| 1880 | 120,722 | * | 46.2% |
| 1890 | 163,003 | | 35.0% |
| 1900 | 206,433 | | 26.6% |
| 1910 | 267,779 | | 29.7% |
| 1920 | 298,103 | | 11.3% |
| 1930 | 316,715 | | 6.2% |
| 1940 | 301,173 | | −4.9% |
| 1950 | 299,017 | | −0.7% |
| 1960 | 276,101 | | −7.7% |
| 1970 | 260,350 | | −5.7% |
| 1980 | 223,532 | | −14.1% |
| 1990 | 228,537 | | 2.2% |
| 2000 | 240,055 | | 5.0% |
| 2010 | 247,597 | | 3.1% |
| 2020 | 292,449 | | 18.1% |
| 2025 (est.) | 302,013 | ▲ | 3.3% |
Population sources: 1840–1920 1840 1850–1870; 1850 1870 1880–1890; 1890–1910 1840–1930; 1940–2000 2000; 2010 2020 * = Gained territory in previous decade.

As of the 2020 census, Jersey City had a population of 292,449, and a population density of 19,835.1 inhabitants per square mile (7,658.4/km^{2}) an increase of 44,852 residents (18.1%) from its 2010 census population of 247,597. Since it was believed the earlier population was under-counted, the 2010 census was anticipated with the possibility that Jersey City might become the state's most populated city, surpassing Newark. The city hired an outside firm to contest the results, citing the fact that development in the city between 2000 and 2010 substantially increased the number of housing units and that new populations may have been under-counted by as many as 30,000 residents based on the city's calculations. Preliminary findings indicated that 19,000 housing units went uncounted.

Per the American Community Survey's 2014–2018 estimates, Jersey City's age distribution was 7.7% of the population under 5, 13.2% between 6–18, 69% – from 19 to 64, and 10.1% who were 65 years of age or older. The median age 34.2 years. Females made up 50.8% of the population and there were 100.1 males per 100 females. 86.5% of the population graduated from high school, while 44.9% of the population had a bachelor's degree or higher. 7.1% of residents under 65 were disabled, while 15.9% of residents live without health insurance.

=== Housing ===
There were 110,801 housing units and 102,353 households in 2018. The average household size was 2.57. The average per capita income was $36,453, and the median household income was $62,739. 18.7% of residents lived below the poverty line. 67.9% of residents 16+ were within the civilian labor force. The mean travel time to work for residents was 36.8 minutes. 28.6% of housing units are owner-occupied, with the median value of the homes being $344,200. The median gross rent in the city was $1,271. The Jersey City Housing Authority (JCHA) is the second largest public housing agency in the state and provides approximately 7,100 housing units for over 15,000 residents.

From 2005 to 2023, Jersey City led New Jersey and the Northeastern United States in housing construction with a 43% increase producing twice as much housing as the rest of the state and 16.7% more than the United States average. Additionally, the city's population increased by 18% with a 20% increase in housing units resulting in housing development surpassing population growth. During this time, the median household income in Jersey City grew by 133%, the fourth-highest increase in the United States with the median home price increasing by 86%. Over this time, Jersey City has matched or surpassed the number of housing units created in Manhattan in a given year. In 2024, Jersey City ranked third in the New York metropolitan area for new apartment construction behind only Brooklyn and Manhattan and ahead of Queens with Jersey City building twice as many units at a rate of 13 units per 1,000 residents. In January 2025, the addition of new rental units to the city's market led to a median rent of $3,050 for one-bedroom units, a decrease of 2.9% year-over-year and a median rent of $3,340 for two-bedroom units, a decrease of 12.1% year-over-year. The trend continued into mid 2025 with rents decreasing for one-bedroom units at about 12% and 16.7% for two-bedroom units year-over-year bringing the city's median rent to $2,920. By August 2025, the median rent decreased to $2,650 and stabilized at $2,860 in May 2026.

Since 2021, Jersey City has enacted several ordinances to expand affordable housing and protect renters. These include an inclusionary zoning ordinance (IZO) requiring developers of large projects seeking a variance or zoning amendment to set aside 10% to 15% of units as affordable housing, an affordable housing overlay (AHO) that allows more density in exchange for the same commitment and a tenant right to counsel (TRTC) law providing free legal aid to renters facing eviction who earn less than 80% of the current area annual median income (AMI). Additionally in 2025, an ordinance passed prohibiting landlords from using AI-driven software to set rental prices resulting in collective rate hikes that eliminate market competition. With the passage of the ordinance, Jersey City became the first municipality in New Jersey to limit rental market manipulation.

=== Race and ethnicity ===
| Historical racial composition | 2020 | 2010 | 1990 | 1970 | 1940 |
|---|---|---|---|---|---|
| White | 27.3% | 32.7% | 48.2% | 77.8% | 95.5% |
| —Non-Hispanic | 23.8% | 21.5% | 36.6% | 69.5% | n/a |
| Black or African American | 19.9% | 25.8% | 29.7% | 21.0% | 4.5% |
| Hispanic or Latino (of any race) | 24.9% | 27.6% | 24.2% | 9.1% | n/a |
| Asian | 28.0% | 23.7% | 11.4% | 0.5% | − |
| Two or more races | 9.7% | 4.4% | - | - | - |

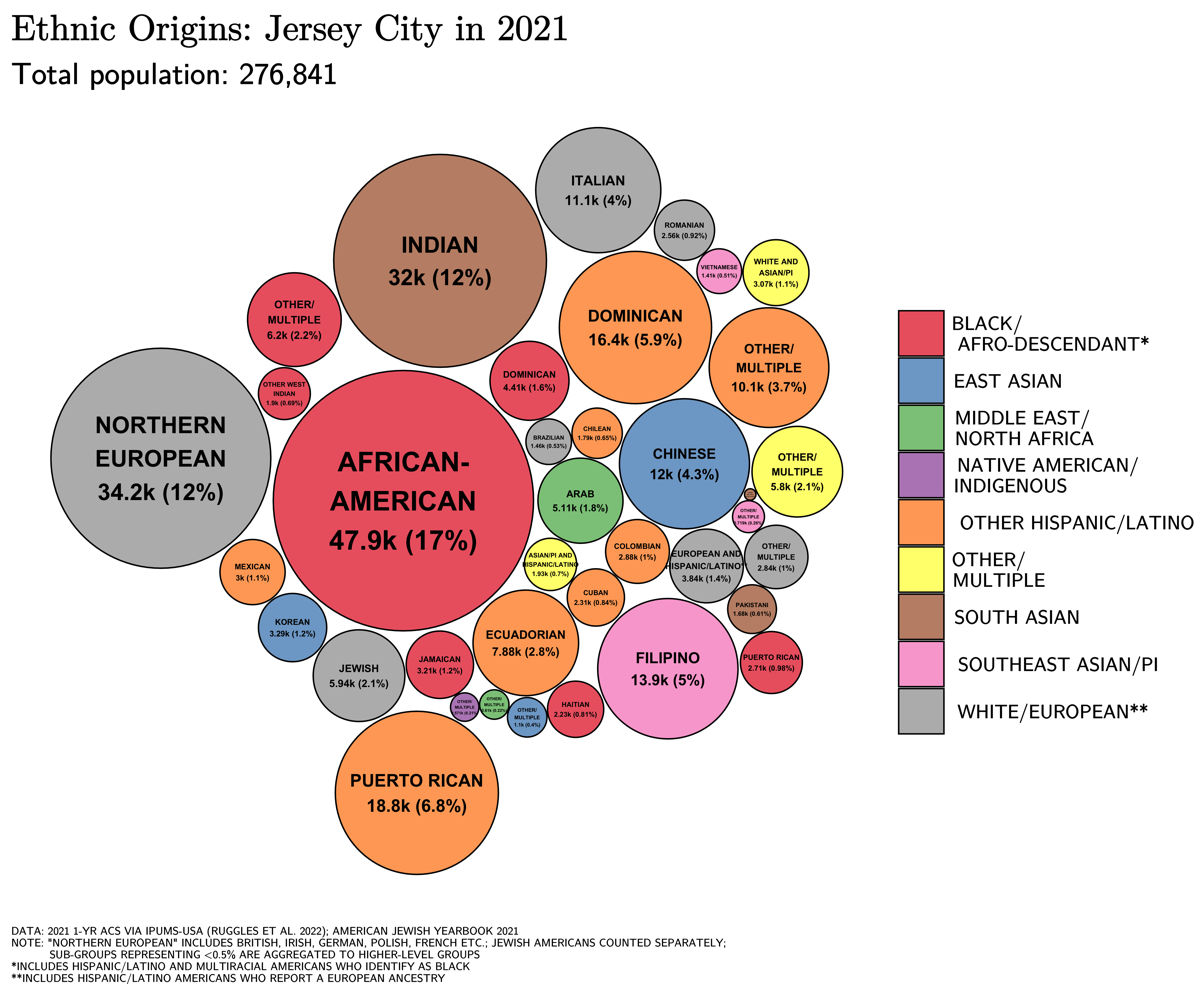
Ethnic origins in Jersey City

Jersey City has been called "one of the most diverse cities in the world" and for several years has been ranked as the most ethnically diverse city in the United States. The city is a major port of entry for immigration to the United States and a major employment center at the approximate core of the New York City metropolitan area; and given its proximity to Manhattan, Jersey City has evolved a globally cosmopolitan ambiance of its own, demonstrating a robust and growing demographic and cultural diversity concerning metrics including "nationality, religion, race, and domiciliary partnership."

The city has undertaken several measures to engage its different immigrant communities. In 2017, Jersey City designated itself a "sanctuary city." In 2018, Jersey City established the Division of Immigrant Affairs within its Department of Health and Human Services (HHS) to support immigrant communities. The division works with nonprofit organizations to expand access to health and human services, immigration legal aid, education and English-language programs, job training, public benefits, and civic engagement opportunities.

In 2020, Jersey City became the first municipality in the United States accredited for offering free legal services to immigrants as part of the United States Department of Justice (DoJ) Recognition and Accreditation Program. Additionally, The New American Economy (NAE) Research Award selected Jersey City to receive NAE research to further address socioeconomic disparities within immigrant populations.

In 2025, the Trump Administration sued Jersey City and its elected officials for the policies associated with the city's status as a sanctuary city. The policies substantially reduce deportations of undocumented immigrants who do not have criminal records, but do not prevent the deportation of those who have violent criminal records. Mayor Steven Fulop (2013–2026) responded to the lawsuit by saying he would not be "bullied" and vowed to fight the federal government. The city requested the lawsuit be dismissed as the sanctuary city designation does not violate federal law.

Jersey City, New Jersey – Racial and ethnic composition Note: the US Census treats Hispanic/Latino as an ethnic category. This table excludes Latinos from the racial categories and assigns them to a separate category. Hispanics/Latinos may be of any race.
| Race / Ethnicity (NH = Non-Hispanic) | Pop 1990 | Pop 2000 | Pop 2010 | Pop 2020 | % 1990 | % 2000 | % 2010 | % 2020 |
|---|---|---|---|---|---|---|---|---|
| White alone (NH) | 83,601 | 56,736 | 53,236 | 69,624 | 36.58% | 23.63% | 21.50% | 23.81% |
| Black or African American alone (NH) | 63,290 | 64,389 | 59,060 | 54,199 | 27.69% | 26.82% | 23.85% | 18.53% |
| Native American or Alaska Native alone (NH) | 638 | 544 | 586 | 638 | 0.28% | 0.23% | 0.24% | 0.22% |
| Asian alone (NH) | 24,895 | 38,623 | 58,106 | 81,425 | 10.89% | 16.09% | 23.47% | 27.84% |
| Native Hawaiian or Pacific Islander alone (NH) | N/A | 117 | 95 | 101 | N/A | 0.05% | 0.04% | 0.03% |
| Other race alone (NH) | 718 | 2,218 | 2,423 | 4,204 | 0.31% | 0.92% | 0.98% | 1.44% |
| Mixed race or Multiracial (NH) | N/A | 9,476 | 5,835 | 9,481 | N/A | 3.95% | 2.36% | 3.24% |
| Hispanic or Latino (any race) | 55,395 | 67,952 | 68,256 | 72,777 | 24.24% | 28.31% | 27.57% | 24.89% |
| Total | 228,537 | 240,055 | 247,597 | 292,449 | 100.00% | 100.00% | 100.00% | 100.00% |

The U.S. Census accounts for race by two methodologies. "Race alone" and "Race alone less Hispanics" where Hispanics are delineated separately as if a separate race.

According to the 2020 U.S. census, the racial makeup (including Hispanics in the racial counts) was 27.32% (79,905) White alone, 19.87% (58,103) Black alone, 0.66% (1,916) Native American alone, 28.01% (81,903) Asian alone, 0.06% (178) Pacific Islander alone, 14.35% (41,970) Other Race alone, and 9.74% (28,474) Multiracial or Mixed Race.

According to the 2020 U.S. census, the racial and ethnic makeup (where Hispanics are excluded from the racial counts and placed in their own category) was 23.81% (69,624) White alone (non-Hispanic), 18.53% (54,199) Black alone (non-Hispanic), 0.22% (638) Native American alone (non-Hispanic), 27.84% (81,425) Asian alone (non-Hispanic), 0.03% (101) Pacific Islander alone (non-Hispanic), 1.44% (4,204) Other Race alone (non-Hispanic), 3.24% (9,481) Multiracial or Mixed Race (non-Hispanic), and 24.89% (72,777) Hispanic or Latino.

There were an estimated 55,493 non-Hispanic whites in Jersey City, according to the 2013–2017 American Community Survey, representing a 4.2% increase from 53,236 non-Hispanic whites enumerated in the 2010 United States census.

An estimated 63,788 African Americans resided in Jersey City, or 24.0% of the city's population in 2017, representing a slight decrease from 64,002 African Americans enumerated in the 2010 United States census. This is in contrast with Hudson County overall, where there were an estimated 84,114 African Americans, according to the 2013–2017 American Community Survey, representing a 2.3% increase from 83,925 African Americans enumerated in the county in the 2010 United States census. However, modest growth in the African immigrant population, most notably the growing Nigerian American and Kenyan American populations in Jersey City, is partially offsetting the decline in the city's American-born black population, which as a whole has been experiencing an exodus from northern New Jersey to the Southern United States.

Approximately 76,637 Latino and Hispanic Americans lived in Jersey City, composing 28.8% of the population in 2017, representing a 12.3% increase from 68,256 Latino or Hispanic Americans enumerated in the 2010 United States census. Stateside Puerto Ricans, making up a third of the city's Latin American or Hispanic population, constituted the largest Hispanic group in Jersey City. Since 1961, Jersey City has hosted its annual Puerto Rican Day Parade and Festival which has grown to be the largest in the state. While Cuban Americans are not as highly concentrated in Jersey City as they are in northern Hudson County, Jersey City has hosted the annual Cuban Parade and Festival of New Jersey at Exchange Place on its downtown waterfront since it was established in 2001.

An estimated 67,526 Asian Americans live in Jersey City, constituting 25.4% of the city's population, representing a 15.2% increase from 58,595 Asian Americans enumerated in the 2010 United States census.

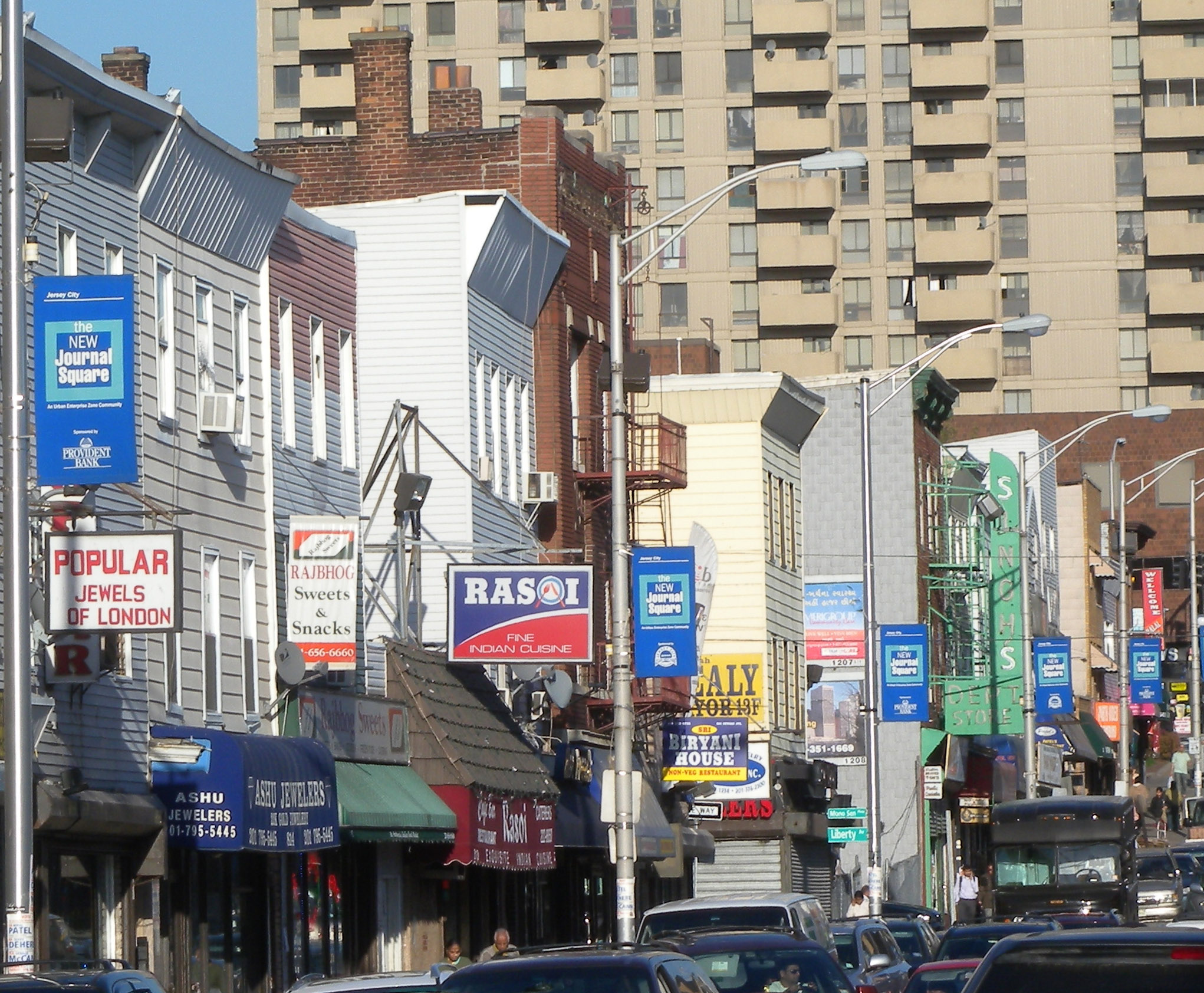
India Square, in the Bombay neighborhood of Jersey City, is home to the highest concentration of Asian Indians in the Western Hemisphere.

India Square, also known as "Little India", "Little Bombay", or "Little Gujarat", home to the highest concentration of Asian Indians in the Western Hemisphere, is a rapidly growing Indian American ethnic enclave in Jersey City. Indian Americans constituted 10.9% of the overall population of Jersey City in 2010, the highest proportion of any major U.S. city. India Square has been home to the largest outdoor Navratri festivities in New Jersey as well as several Hindu temples; while an annual, color-filled spring Holi festival has taken place in Jersey City since 1992, centered upon India Square and attracting significant participation and international media attention. In 2017 there were an estimated 31,578 Indian Americans in Jersey City, representing a 16.5% increase from 27,111 Indian Americans enumerated in the 2010 United States census.

Filipino grocery store in Jersey City

Filipino Americans, numbering 16,610 residents, made up 6.2% of Jersey City's population in 2017. The Five Corners district serves as a prominent Little Manila of Jersey City, being home to a thriving Filipino community that forms the second-largest Asian-American subgroup in the city. A variety of Filipino restaurants, shippers and freighters, doctors' offices, bakeries, stores, and even an office of The Filipino Channel have made Newark Avenue their home in recent decades. The largest Filipino-owned grocery store on the East Coast, Phil-Am Food, has been established on the avenue since 1973. An array of Filipino-owned businesses can also be found in the West Side section of the city, where many residents are of Filipino descent. In 2006, Red Ribbon Bakeshop, one of the Philippines' most famous food chains, opened its first branch on the East Coast: a new pastry outlet in Jersey City. Manila Avenue in Downtown Jersey City was named for the Philippine capital city because of the many Filipinos who built their homes on the street during the 1970s. A memorial dedicated to the Filipino-American veterans of the Vietnam War was built in a small square on Manila Avenue. A park and statue dedicated to Jose P. Rizal, a national hero of the Philippines, are also located in Downtown Jersey City. Furthermore, Jersey City hosts the annual Philippine–American Friendship Day Parade along West Side Avenue ending at Lincoln Park with a day long festival, an event that occurs yearly on the last Sunday in June. The City Hall of Jersey City raises the Philippine flag in correlation with this event and as a tribute to the contributions of the local Filipino community. The city's annual Santacruzan procession has taken place since 1977 along Manila Avenue.

Behind English and Spanish, Tagalog is the third-most-common language spoken in Jersey City.

Jersey City was home to an estimated 9,379 Chinese Americans in 2017, representing a notably rapid growth of 66.2% from the 5,643 Chinese Americans enumerated in the 2010 United States census. Chinese nationals have also been obtaining EB-5 immigrant visas by investing US$500,000 apiece in new Downtown Jersey City residential skyscrapers.

New Jersey's largest Vietnamese American population resides in Jersey City. There were an estimated 1,813 Vietnamese Americans in Jersey City, according to the 2013–2017 American Community Survey, representing a 12.8% increase from 1,607 Vietnamese Americans enumerated in the 2010 United States census.

Arab Americans numbered an estimated 18,628 individuals in Hudson County per the 2013–2017 American Community Survey, representing 2.8% of the county's total population. Arab Americans are the second- highest percentage in New Jersey after Passaic County. Arab Americans are most concentrated in Jersey City, led by Egyptian Americans, including the largest population of Coptic Christians in the United States. Since 1979, the city along with the Arab American community hosts the Milad Parade celebrating the birth of the Islamic prophet Muhammad. The Egyptian American community hosts the annual Egyptian Festival in Journal Square every October since 2006.

=== Sexual orientation and gender identity ===
In 2010, there were 2,726 same-sex couples in Hudson County, with Jersey City being the hub, prior to the commencement of same-sex marriages in New Jersey on October 21, 2013. Following the ruling, Jersey City was one of the first municipalities in New Jersey to issue marriage licenses and officiate ceremonies for same-sex couples. Jersey City is considered one of the most LGBT-friendly communities in New Jersey and has achieved a perfect score from the Municipal Equality Index (MEI) for LGBTQ+ equality in municipal law, policies, and services for 12 consecutive years.

Founded in 1993, the Hudson Pride Connections Center, located in Journal Square, is the largest LGBTQ+ social services center in New Jersey, advocating for the physical, mental, social, and political well-being of the diverse LGBTQ+ community and its supporters.

Every August since 2000, Jersey City hosts the Jersey City LBGTQ+ Pride Festival (JC Pride), which has grown to become one of the largest pride festivals in New Jersey, attracting over 25,000 attendees. The celebrations begin on the first of the month with a Progress Pride Flag raising ceremony at City Hall.

=== Religion ===
Nearly 59.6% of Jersey City's inhabitants are religious adherents, of which 46.2% are Catholic Christians and 7.3% are Protestant Christians. Muslims constituted 3.4% of religious adherents in Jersey City. Dharmic religions, including Buddhism, Hinduism, and Sikhism, make up 1.5% of the city's religious demographic, with Judaism at 0.6%. Jersey City has a growing Orthodox Jewish population, centered in the Greenville neighborhood.

== Economy ==
Jersey City is a regional employment center and one of the largest in the state with over 100,000 private and public sector jobs, creating a daytime swell in population. Many jobs are in the financial and service sectors, as well as in shipping, logistics, and retail. From 1995 to 2003, Jersey City led the 100 largest cities in the United States in job growth and poverty reduction with a 4.7% increase in inner city wage growth. From 2020 to 2021, the city's employment rate increased by 8.12% from 140,000 to 151,000 employees. Tech and IT jobs made up 15.5% of all jobs created during that span.

Jersey City's tax base grew by $136 million in 2017, giving Jersey City the largest municipal tax base in the State of New Jersey. As part of a 2017 revaluation, the city's property tax base is expected to increase from $6.2 billion to $26 billion. As of 2024, the city's tax base is the largest in the state valued at over $57 billion.

In 2026, the New Jersey Economic Development Authority (NJEDA) opened the New Jersey Business Acceleration and Softlanding Ecosystem (NJ BASE) innovation center at Harborside focused on attracting international companies in sectors that are central to the state's economy, such as cybersecurity, artificial intelligence and fintech. NJ BASE will host approximately 15-20 companies across 7,200 sq ft (670 m^{2}) of Class A office space.

=== Wall Street West ===
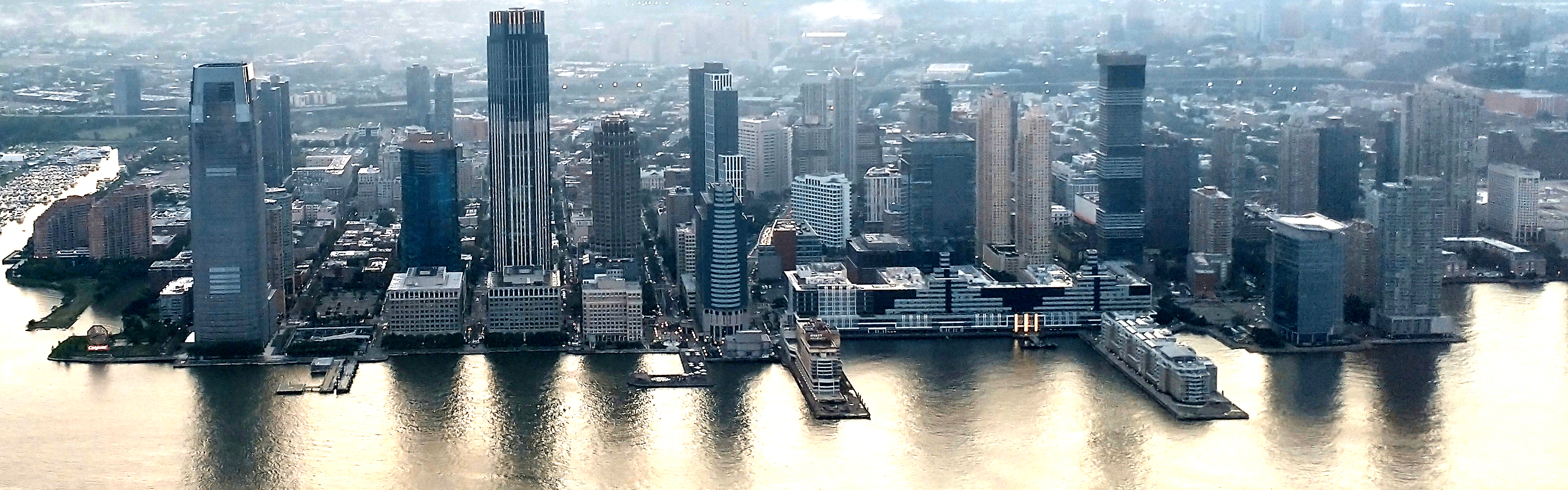
Wall Street West as seen from One World Trade Center in 2023

Jersey City's Hudson River waterfront, from Exchange Place to Newport, is known as Wall Street West and has over 13,000,000 square feet (1,200,000 m^{2}) of Class A office space and over 18,000,000 square feet (1,700,000 m^{2}) of total office space for the nation's 12th-largest downtown and the state's largest office market. One-third of the private sector jobs in the city are in the financial services sector: more than 60% are in the securities industry, 20% are in banking and 8% in insurance.

Jersey City is the headquarters of the National Stock Exchange. Jersey City is also home to the headquarters of Verisk Analytics and Lord Abbett, a privately held money management firm. Companies such as Computershare, ADP, IPC Systems, and Fidelity Investments also conduct operations in the city. Fintech firms such as Revenued and Bluevine are headquartered in Jersey City to service the financial sector. In 2014, Forbes magazine moved its headquarters to the district, having been awarded a $27 million tax grant in exchange for bringing 350 jobs to the city over ten years. Also in 2014, RBC Bank announced it was moving 900 jobs to 207,000 sq ft (19,200 m^{2}) of office space at 30 Hudson Street at Exchange Place. In 2015, JPMorgan Chase expanded their presence in Jersey City by relocating 2,150 jobs from Manhattan to a company owned office building in Newport. In 2020, American International Group (AIG) announced it was leasing 230,000 sq ft (21,000 m^{2}) of office space at 30 Hudson St. starting in 2021. The Bank of Montreal renewed its lease of 10,365 sq ft (962.9 m^{2}) office space in 2024 at Harborside. In 2024, Bank of America announced that they leased approximately 550,000 sq ft (51,000 m^{2}) of office space over 21 floors at Newport Tower in the Newport neighborhood. It represents the largest New Jersey office space lease in the last decade.

=== Life science and technology industry ===
The life science and technology industry is a rapidly growing and expanding sector for Jersey City. In 2024, Jersey City was ranked as the 5th top tech city in the United States and now houses 394 different Tech and IT firms with 15.5% of all jobs in Jersey City being created in that sector from 2020 to 2021. The city hosts five data centers that support the local tech and fintech industry. In 2026, the city council passed an ordinance prohibiting the construction of standalone data centers in the city's industrial districts.

In 2020, Merck & Co spin-off Organon International leased 110,000 sq ft (10,000 m^{2}) of office space and located its headquarters at the Goldman Sachs Tower via WeWork.

In 2021, the Liberty Science Center broke ground on SciTech Scity, a 30 acres (0.12 km^{2}) campus across the street from the science center that will serve as a hub for life sciences, health care and technology. The $450 million campus will include Edge Works, an eight-story facility that will feature laboratories, research and development spaces, office suites, co-working spaces for startups, a tech exhibition hall and a state-of-the-art conference center. Sheba Medical Center is an anchor tenant and will develop a "hospital of the future" simulation space that will be known as "Liberty Science ARC HealthSpace 2030". Other anchor tenants are RWJBarnabas Health, Bristol Myers Squibb, EY and Nokia Bell Labs. Additionally, the campus will include Liberty Science Center High School, a new STEM public high school that will be administered by the Hudson County Schools of Technology and Scholars Village, a 500-unit residential project that will be marketed toward families and individuals in tech related industries.

Another life science and innovation hub called "The Cove" was announced in 2022. The 13 acres (0.053 km^{2}) campus site is near SciTech Scity and will be a mixed-use development with 1,400,000 sq ft (130,000 m^{2}) of life science office and research space, 1,600,000 sq ft (150,000 m^{2}) of residential space and feature a 3.5 acres (0.014 km^{2}) public waterfront park.

In 2023, the biotechnology firm EpiBone, a company that grows bone and cartilage for skeletal reconstruction, announced it would move from Brooklyn to Jersey City and lease 28,089 sq ft (2,609.6 m^{2}) of lab space at 95 Greene Street, a purpose built life science facility at Exchange Place. The following year in 2024, RegenLab USA, which manufactures devices for the production of regenerative cell therapy, announced that they would also move from Brooklyn to Jersey City and lease 15,792 sq ft (1,467.1 m^{2}) of lab space in the same facility.

In 2024, biopharmaceutical company Eikon Therapeutics moved into 36,000 sq ft (3,300 m^{2}) of office space at Harborside.

In 2025, AI and IT company Hexaware Technologies leased the entire the 24th floor of Harborside 5 for their global headquarters. That same year, cloud-native IT consultancy firm Zoi North America Inc. opened its United States headquarters in Downtown Jersey City.

Pharmaceutical company, Compass Pathways, opened its new 6,327 sq ft (587.8 m^{2}) U.S. headquarters at Exchange Place in 2026 after relocating from Manhattan.

=== Sports betting ===
Jersey City has quickly grown to be a leader in the sports betting industry and the sports betting epicenter of the United States. BetMGM and Caesars Sports Book have established their headquarters at Exchange Place along the Hudson River Waterfront and several other sports book such as FanDuel, Draft Kings and Fanatics have offices in Jersey City. FanDuel expanded their operations with a new 12,000 square feet (1,100 m^{2}) office at Newport in 2025. With New Jersey having a long history of legalized gambling and also being a hub for tech employees, Jersey City has become an extension of the gaming industry in Atlantic City.

=== Retail ===
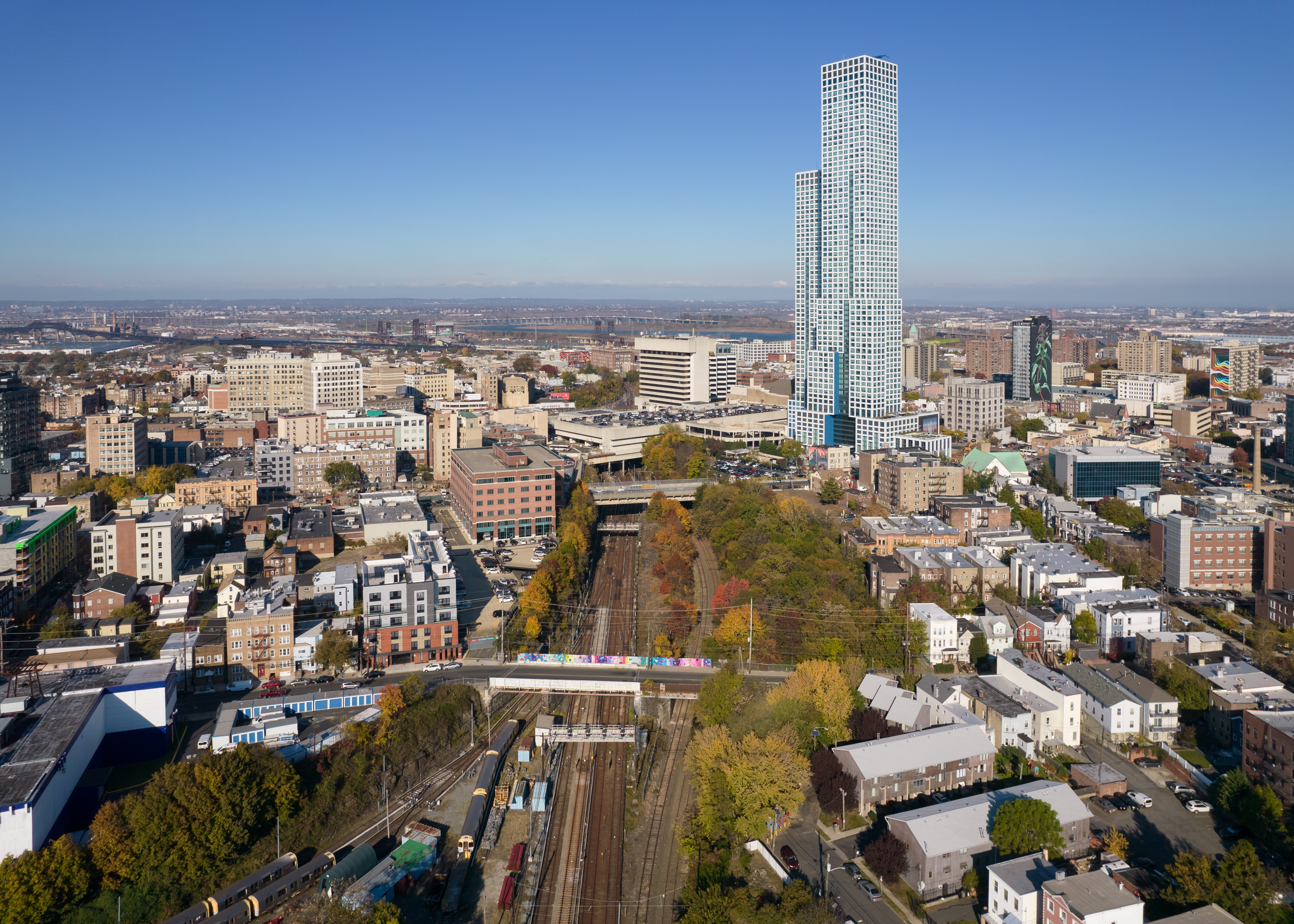
The Journal Square district in 2021

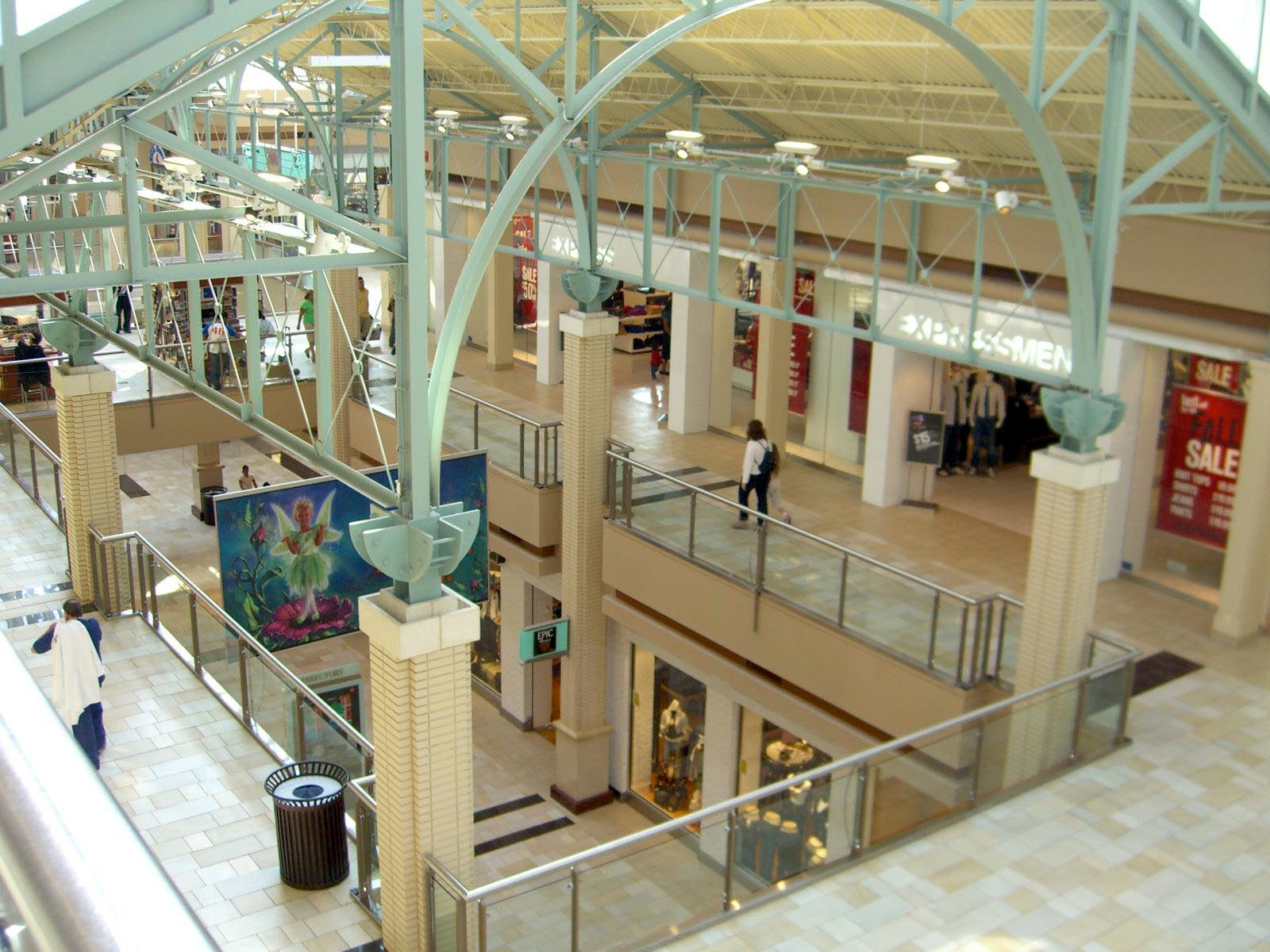
Newport Centre Mall in 2006

Jersey City has several shopping districts, some of which are traditional main streets for their respective neighborhoods, such as Central, Danforth, Newark and West Side Avenues. Lower Newark Avenue in Downtown Jersey City was converted to a permanent three-block long pedestrian plaza in 2022 becoming a hub for the city's dining, nightlife and cultural arts scene. Journal Square is a major historic commercial and central business district that includes neighborhoods in the broader area such as Bergen Square, McGinley Square, India Square, the Five Corners and portions of the Marion Section. Jersey City has two malls, Newport Centre Mall, a regional indoor shopping mall in Downtown Jersey City, and Hudson Mall, a "non traditional" indoor shopping mall on the city's West Side.

Portions of the city are part of an Urban Enterprise Zone (UEZ). Jersey City was selected in 1983 to be part of the initial group of 10 zones chosen to participate in the program. In addition to other benefits to encourage employment and investment within the Zone, shoppers can take advantage of a reduced 3.3125% sales tax rate (half of the 6.625% rate charged statewide) at eligible merchants. Established in November 1992, the city's Urban Enterprise Zone status was set to expire in November 2023 but was extended by the state in 2021 for 10 additional years. Jersey City is the state's largest and most productive Urban Enterprise Zone encompassing one-third of the city.

=== E-commerce and distribution ===
Jersey City's central location in the New York metropolitan area along with its extensive rail and road infrastructure and connectivity has made the city an important distribution center with companies such as Sysco having their distribution operations based in the city.

Tropicana opened a 210,000 square feet (20,000 m^{2}) packaging and sales facility at Greenville Yard in 1991. The facility is supplied by the "Juice Train" from Bradenton, Florida and features an automatic storage and retrieval system in a refrigerated warehouse, juice packing machines and an administrative sales office. The center supplies the entire Northeast and all of Canada with orange juice.

In 2000, Summit Import Corporation relocated their headquarters and logistics facility from New York City to Jersey City with the opening of a 120,000 square feet (11,000 m^{2}) office building and distribution facility at Greenville Yard.

Evergreen Marine Corporation moved its U.S. headquarters back to Jersey City to the Harborside neighborhood in 2003 from Morristown along with 200 jobs. Evergreen's headquarters had previously been in Jersey City from 1989 to 1999.

In 2011 DeBragga & Spitler, formerly the largest meat purveyor in Manhattan's Meatpacking District, moved their base of operations to a 25,000 square feet (2,300 m^{2}) purpose built facility in an industrial area of the Bergen-Lafayette neighborhood.

In 2013, Imperial Dade opened its 535,000 square feet (49,700 m^{2}) distribution center and headquarters on U.S. Route 1/9 Truck in the Marion neighborhood on the city's West Side.

East Coast Warehouse and Distribution expanded its warehouse operations by 200,000 square feet (19,000 m^{2}) in 2017.

Goya Foods, which had been headquartered in adjacent Secaucus, opened a new headquarters including a 600,000-square-foot (56,000 m^{2}) warehouse and distribution center in Jersey City in April 2015.

In 2019, Nuts.com moved its headquarters to 25,000 sq ft (2,300 m^{2}) of office space at Exchange Place.

In 2024, CVS Health leased 427,000 square feet (39,700 m^{2}) of space at the newly constructed 86 acres (0.35 km^{2}) HRP Hudson Logistics Park in the Croxton section of Jersey City. In 2025, DHL Express relocated its Manhattan service center to a 92,505 square feet (8,594.0 m^{2}) facility in the logistics park.

In 2025, Daylight Transport opened a 11.5-acre (4.7 ha) shipping terminal on Tonnelle Avenue (U.S Route 1/9) in The Heights. The project included a modernized sanitary pump station and new public sidewalks. Later that year, Furniture of America opened a 500,000 square feet (46,000 m^{2}) distribution center, known as FOA East, at Greenville Yard.

=== Port Jersey ===
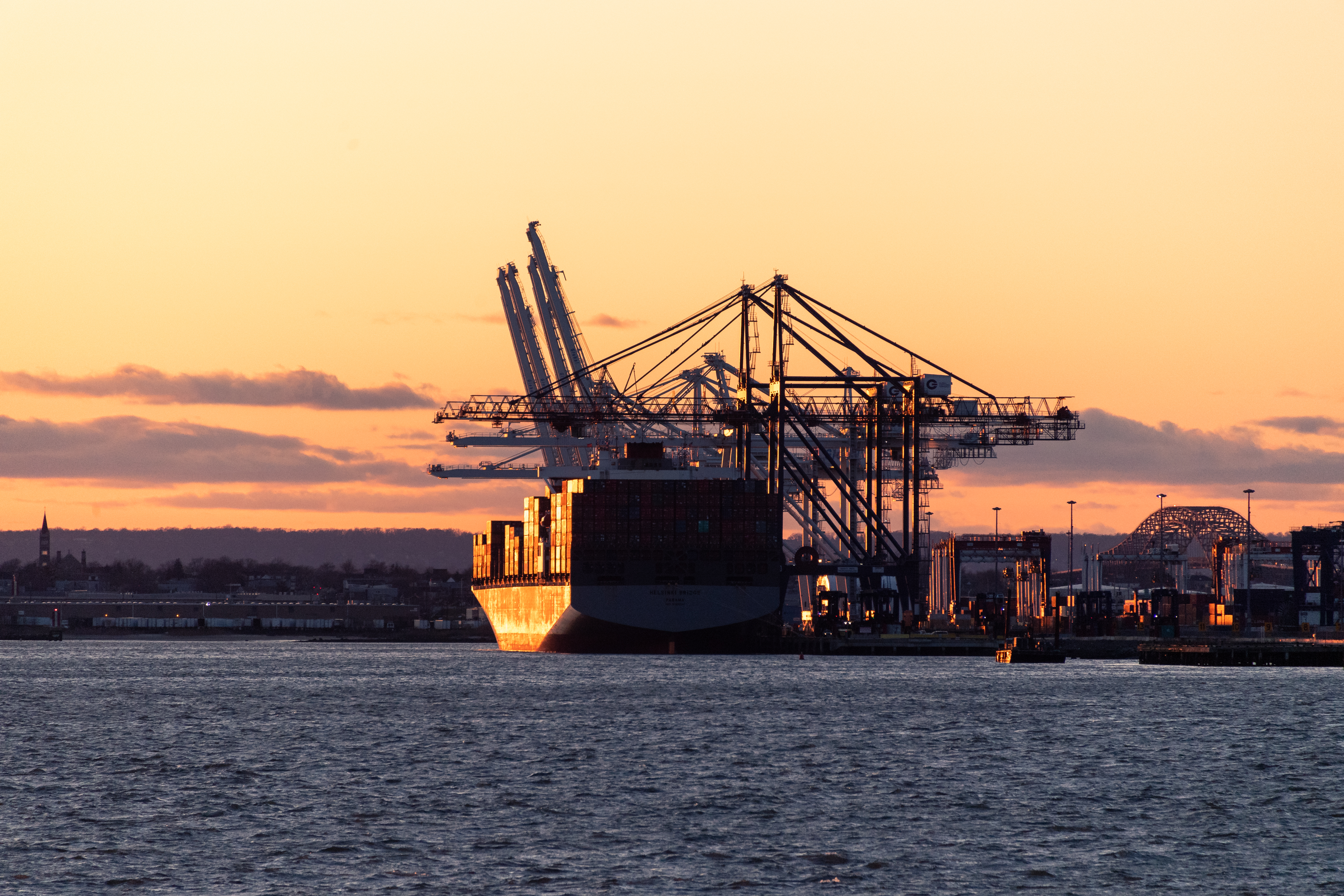
Container ship docked at Port Jersey

Port Jersey is an intermodal freight transport facility that includes a container terminal located on the Upper New York Bay in the Port of New York and New Jersey. The municipal border of the cities of Jersey City and Bayonne runs along the long pier extending into the bay.

The north end of the facility houses the Greenville Yard, a rail yard located on a manmade peninsula that was built in the early 1900s by the Pennsylvania Railroad. New York New Jersey Rail is a switching and terminal railroad headquartered in Greenville Yard that operates the only car float in New York Harbor between Jersey City and Brooklyn. Operations were expanded in 2017 with a new barge, NYNJR100, that features four tracks that can carry up to 18 rail cars of 60-foot (18 m) length, with up to 2,298 long tons (2,335 tonne) of cargo. A second barge of the same capacity, NYNJR200, was delivered in 2018 with an older 14-car barge, the 278, still in service. In 2019, the $600 million expansion was completed with the construction of an Express Rail facility that features 9,600 ft (2,900 m) of track over eight tracks serviced by two rail mounted gantry cranes with a yearly capacity of 250,000 container lifts.

The central area of the facility contains Port Liberty Bayonne, a major post-panamax shipping facility operated by CMA CGM that underwent a major expansion in June 2014. The largest ship ever to call at the Port of New York-New Jersey, the MOL Benefactor, docked at Port Jersey in July 2016 after sailing from China through the newly widened Panama Canal. In 2024, Port Jersey received four new super post panamax cranes capable of serving 24,000 twenty-foot equivalent unit (TEU) vessels raising the number of cranes at the port from eight to twelve. A third berth for vessels with a depth of 55 feet (17 m) was also constructed.

=== Other ===
Iron Mountain opened its 55,000 sq ft (5,100 m^{2}) flagship Secure Shredding facility in Jersey City to serve the New York metropolitan area in 2006. The facility can shred 200 tons of paper per day and up to 48,000 tons per year along with other physical media.

From 2008 to 2013, Jersey City was one of nine cities in New Jersey designated as eligible for Urban Transit Hub Tax Credits by the New Jersey Economic Development Authority (NJEDA). Developers who invested a minimum of $50 million within 0.5 miles (0.8 km) of a train station were eligible for a pro-rated tax credit.

In 2014, the apparel and foot ware company, VF Corporation, moved 145 workers from Manhattan to 42,000 sq ft (3,900 m^{2}) of office space in Newport.

In 2015, tax preparation company Jackson Hewitt moved its national headquarters from Parsippany to Exchange Place.

IT Cosmetics has been headquartered in the Newport neighborhood since 2008. In 2017, the company expanded its headquarters to 60,000 sq ft (5,600 m^{2}) a year after it was acquired by L'Oréal. That same year, luxury fashion label Tory Burch relocated several offices from Manhattan to 93,000 sq ft (8,600 m^{2}) of office space at Newport.

In 2021, LifeCap farms opened an organic mushroom farm in a 6,000 sq ft (560 m^{2}) warehouse featuring a laboratory, incubation room and grow rooms. In 2022, Oishii, a vertical farming company that grows strawberries, moved its headquarters to Jersey City and opened a 74,000 sq ft (6,900 m^{2}) vertical farm.

In 2022, the sports memorabilia company, Collectors Holdings, owned by New York Mets owner Steve Cohen, leased 130,000 sq ft (12,000 m^{2}) of space for its authentication and grading services at Harborside 3 along the Hudson River Waterfront.

In 2023, Whole Foods Market moved its Northeast headquarters from Englewood Cliffs to 47,000 sq ft (4,400 m^{2}) of office space at Harborside along with the opening of a 51,156 sq ft (4,752.5 m^{2}) store.

In 2024, sports and leisure equipment manufacturer Technogym open an 18,000 sq ft (1,700 m^{2}) office at Exchange Place. The following year, the company moved its U.S. headquarters from Fairfield, Connecticut to Jersey City along with opening a new 12,000 sq ft (1,100 m^{2}) distribution facility in New Jersey.

In 2025, electronics company Casio America Inc. leased 13,647 sq ft (1,267.8 m^{2}) at Harborside 5 for their new sales and marketing headquarters.

== Notable landmarks ==
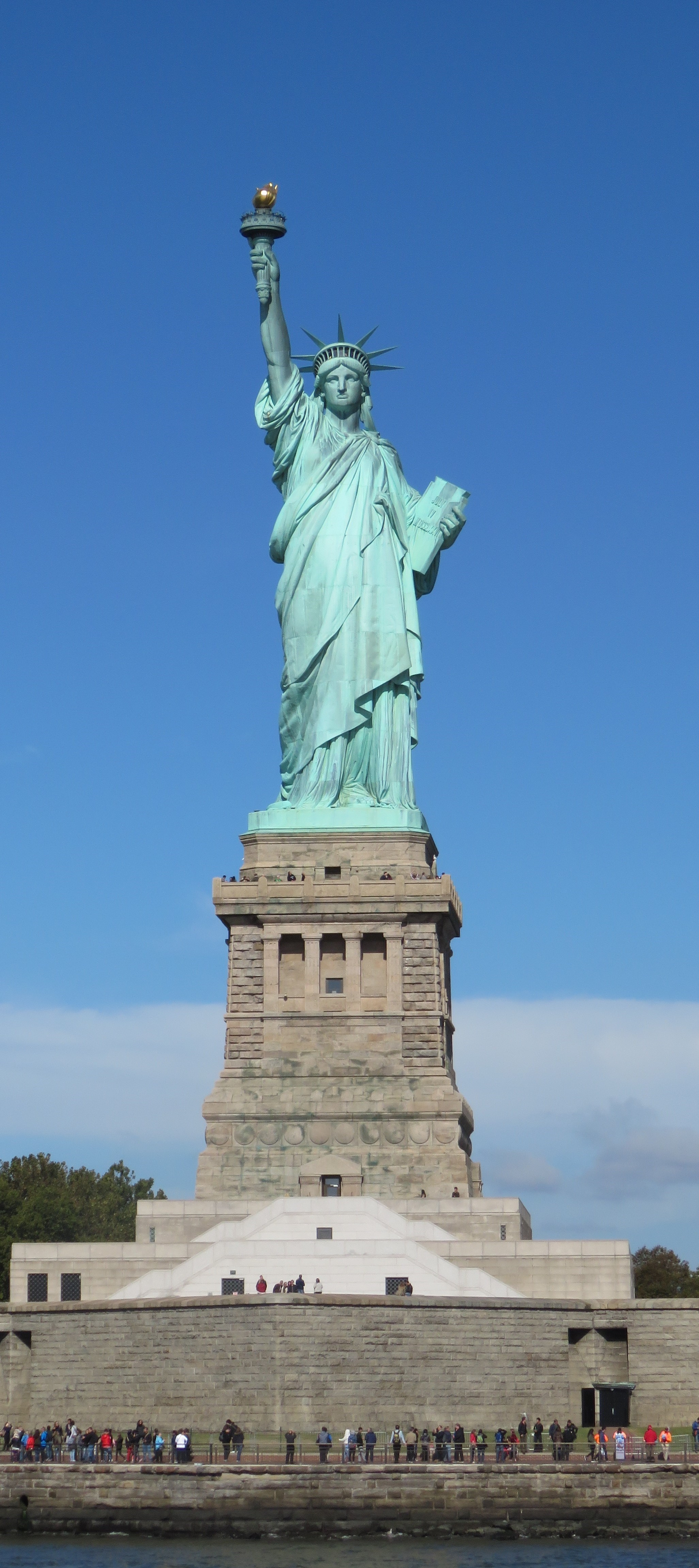
Statue of Liberty

- Statue of Liberty National Monument, Ellis Island and Liberty Island (Liberty Island and part of Ellis Island are located in New York, but both islands are closer to the New Jersey shoreline.)
- The Liberty Science Center, is a 300,000-square-foot (28,000 m^{2}) science museum and learning center located in Liberty State Park.
- The Peter Stuyvesant Monument by J. Massey Rhind is a memorial to Peter Stuyvesant and the establishment of settlement of Bergen, New Netherlands in 1660. Erected in 1910 to commemorate the 250th anniversary of the establishment of Bergen.
- The Katyń Memorial by Polish-American artist Andrzej Pitynski on Exchange Place is the first memorial of its kind to be raised on American soil to honor the dead of the Katyń Forest Massacre.
- The Lincoln the Mystic is a memorial honoring Abraham Lincoln by James Earle Fraser at the entrance to Lincoln Park.

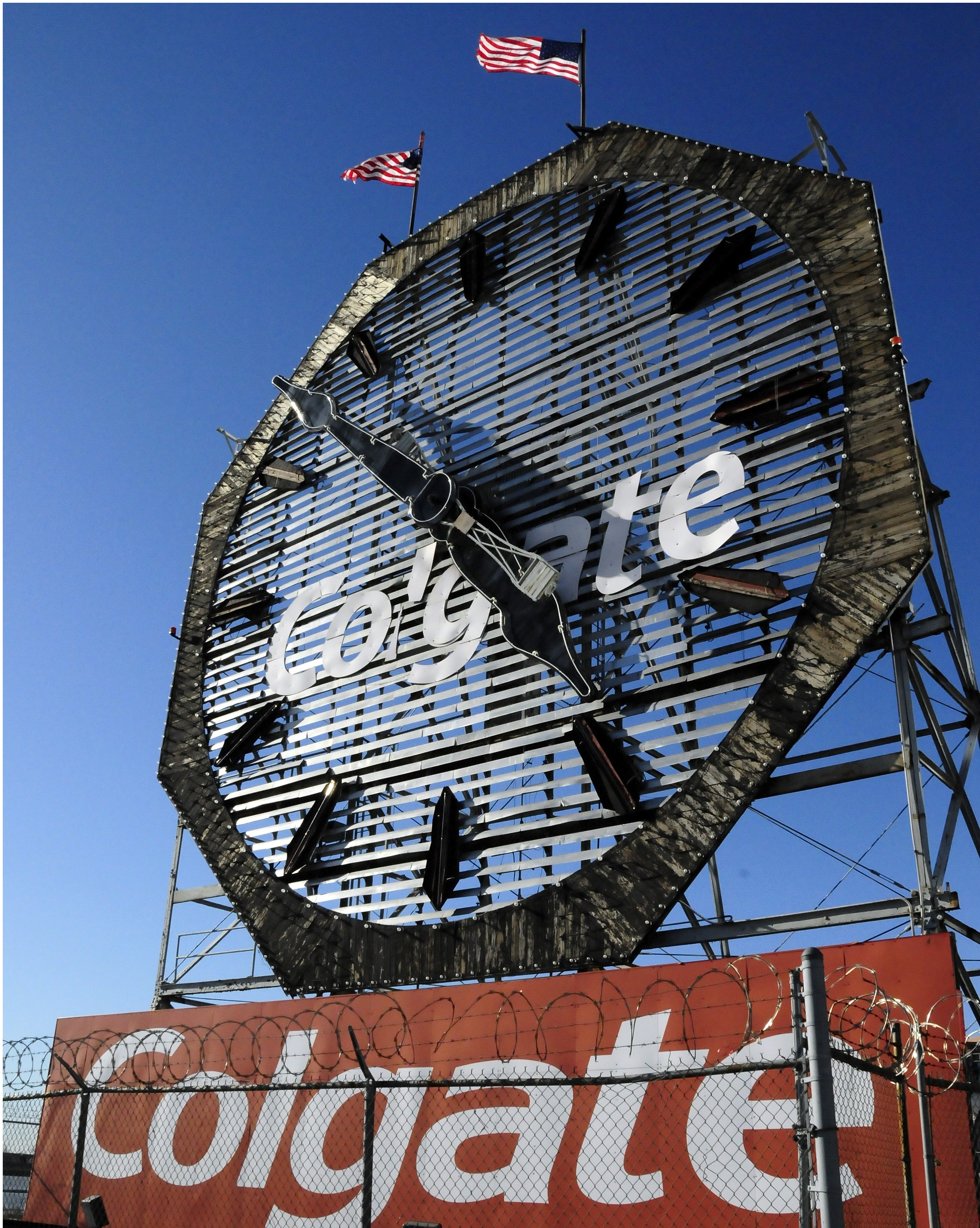
Colgate Clock in 2009

- The Colgate Clock, promoted by Colgate-Palmolive as the largest in the world, sits in Jersey City and faces Lower New York Bay and Lower Manhattan (it is clearly visible from Battery Park in lower Manhattan). The clock, which is 50 feet (15 m) in diameter with a minute hand weighing 2,200 pounds (1,000 kg), was erected in 1924 to replace a smaller one that was relocated to a plant in Jeffersonville, Indiana.
- The Landmark Loew's Jersey Theatre, one of the five Loew's Wonder Theatres constructed in the 1920s and the only one located outside of New York City, is located in Journal Square. Currently presenting classic films, live performances, and events while the theatre undergoes restoration by volunteers.
- The Van Wagenen House, also known as the "Apple Tree House". Built in 1740, it is one of the oldest structures in Jersey City and is the purported site of a meeting between George Washington and the Marquis de Lafayette in 1779 during the Revolutionary War. It is now home to the Museum of Jersey City History.
- The White Eagle Hall is a renovated and re-opened historic theater. Constructed in 1910, it had served as the practice gym for the Saint Anthony High School Friars basketball program.
- The Jersey City 9/11 Memorial erected to memorialize the 38 Jersey City residents that were killed during the September 11 attacks at the World Trade Center. The site of the memorial was a triage set up during the '9/11 boatlift' operation and afterwards became a staging area for rescue operations.
- The Empty Sky memorial, designed by Jessica Jamroz and Frederic Schwartz, is located in Liberty State Park and honors the 746 New Jerseyans that were killed during the 1993 World Trade Center bombing and September 11 attacks.
- The Statue of Mary McLeod Bethune designed by Alvin Petit who said "As a broader significance, this also plays a role in linking our City with a national movement to erect monuments that symbolize diversity and inclusiveness. This will be the first statue in Jersey City to honor the legacy of an African American woman."

== Art and culture ==
Based upon a 2011 survey of census data on the number of artists as a percentages of the population, The Atlantic magazine called Jersey City the 10th-most-artistic city in the United States. On November 3, 2020, Jersey City residents voted to create the Arts and Culture Trust Fund to provide funding for local arts organizations and artists and increased opportunities for youth arts education. The city became the first municipality in New Jersey to create a dedicated tax to support the arts. In 2023, Americans for the Arts released the Arts & Economic Prosperity 6 (AEP6) study on the nation's non-profit arts and culture sector. The study found that in 2022, Jersey City's arts and culture sector generated $46 million in economic activity while supporting 532 jobs, providing $28.2 million in personal income to residents and generating $7.1 million in local, state and federal tax revenue.

=== Museums, libraries and galleries ===
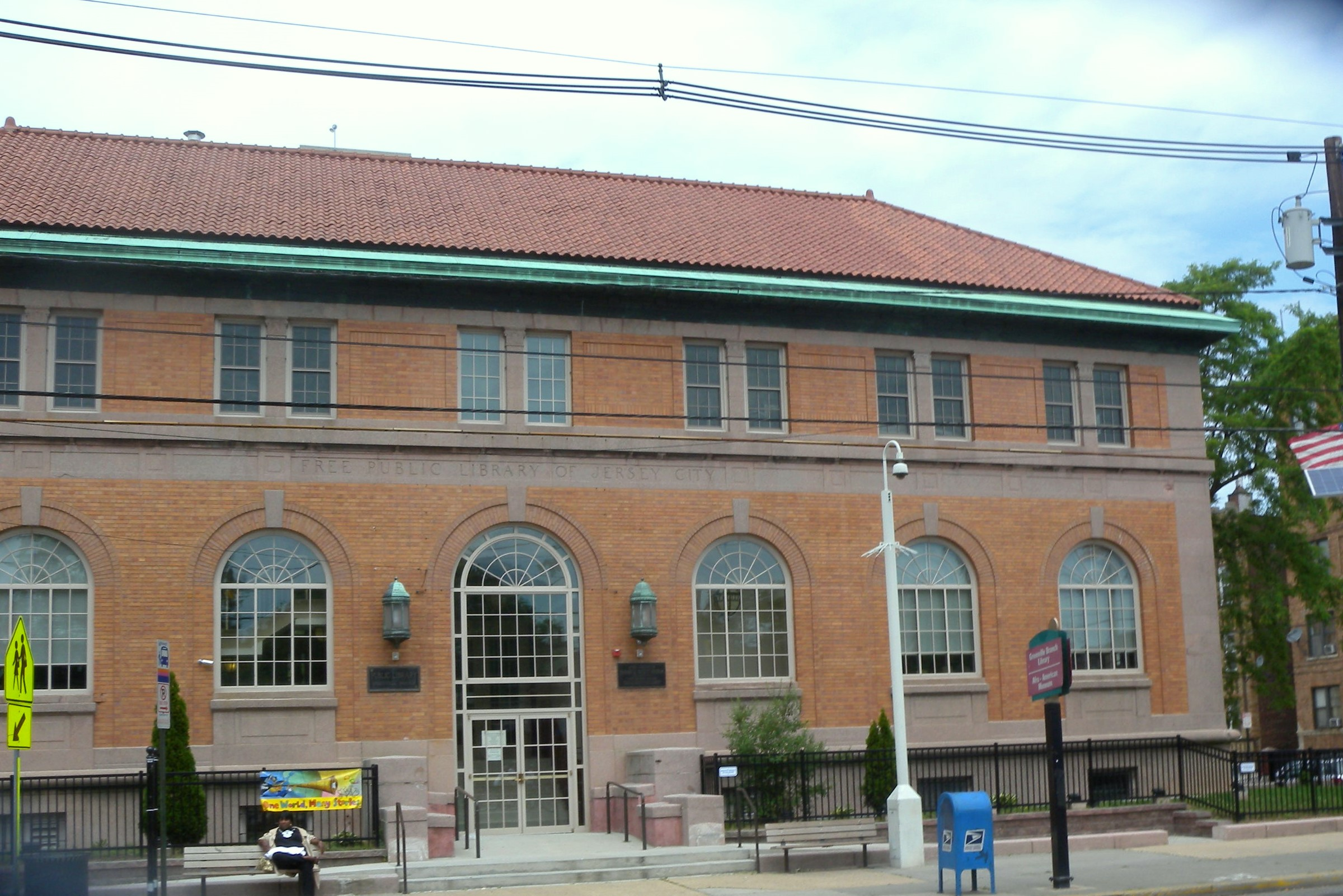
Morgan Branch Library, home of the Afro-American Historical and Cultural Society Museum

The Jersey City Free Public Library is the largest municipal library system in New Jersey. It has a Main Library, bookmobile and ten branches with the newest branch, the Communipaw Branch, opening in 2024 in the Communipaw-Lafayette neighborhood as a public innovation hub for Jersey City and a hub for STEAM learning, equipped with a makerspace that includes a range of tools from 3D printers to a recording studio.

The Main Library Branch features the New Jersey Room, a wing dedicated to historical documents about New Jersey, with a focus on Hudson County and Jersey City. Created in 1964, the room merged the collections of William H. Richardson and the Hudson County Historical Society with material the library already possessed. The New Jersey Room holds over 20,000 volumes, in addition to historical maps and periodicals.

The Afro-American Historical and Cultural Society Museum is located on the upper floor of the Greenville Branch of the Jersey City Public Library and features the heritage of Jersey City's African American community which has been preserved in a special collection. Additionally, a permanent collection of material culture of New Jersey's African Americans as well as African artifacts is also on display.

The Museum of Jersey City History is located in the historic Van Wagenen House on Bergen Square and features rotating and permanent exhibitions on the history of Jersey City.

Liberty State Park is home to the Central Railroad of New Jersey Terminal, the Interpretive Center, and Liberty Science Center, an interactive science and learning center. The center, which first opened in 1993 as New Jersey's first major state science museum, has science exhibits, the world's largest IMAX Dome theater, numerous educational resources, and the original Hoberman sphere. In 2017, the center debuted the Jennifer Chalsty Planetarium, the largest in the Western Hemisphere and the fourth largest in the world. From the park, ferries travel to both Ellis Island and the Immigration Museum and Liberty Island, site of the Statue of Liberty.

The Jersey City Museum, Mana Contemporary, and the Museum of Russian Art, which specializes in Soviet Nonconformist Art, include permanent art collections and special exhibits such as the International Center of Photography photographic collection, reading room and archives, the Middle East Center for the Arts (MECA) and the Richard Meier Model Museum at Mana. Some stations of the Hudson Bergen Light Rail feature public art exhibitions, including those at Exchange Place, Danforth Avenue and Martin Luther King Drive station.

Jersey City is also home to several art galleries of various scale and size including the Harold B. Lemmerman Gallery and Visial Arts Gallery at Kean Jersey City, the Fine Arts Gallery at Saint Peter's University, the Jersey City Art School 313 Gallery as well as Drawing Rooms, SMUSH Gallery, Pro Arts Jersey City - Art 150 Gallery and Novado Gallery to name a few.

=== Performing arts ===
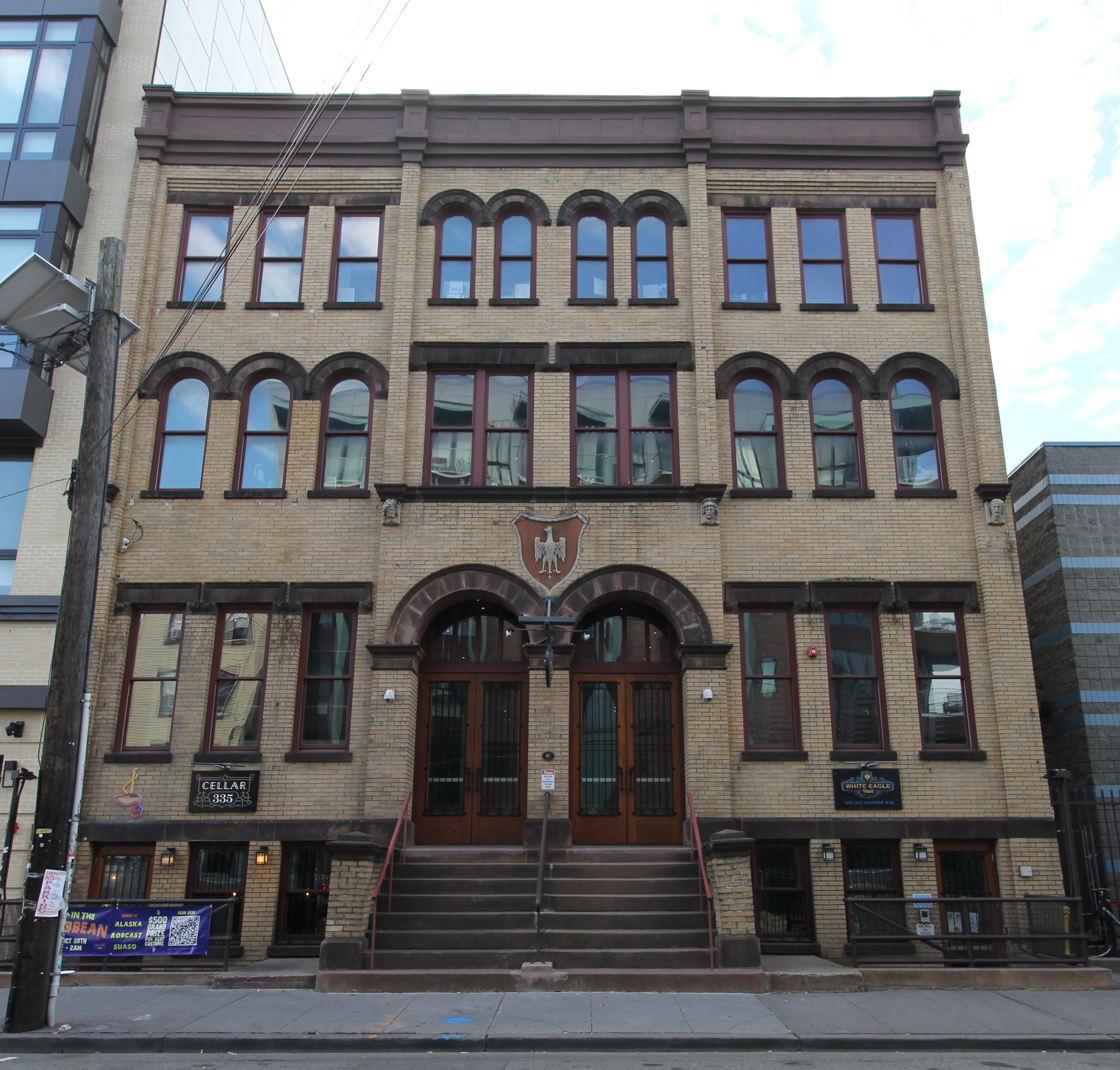
The exterior of White Eagle Hall

White Eagle Hall is a 400-seat (800 general admission) performing arts venue located in the Village neighborhood of Downtown Jersey City. It first opened in 1910 as a performing arts venue and parish hall for St. Anthony of Padua Catholic Church. For many years after it was the practice gym of the historic national powerhouse St. Anthony High School Friars basketball team led by Hall of Fame Coach Bob Hurley. It reopened in 2017 after a three-year $6 million renovation as a performing arts, gallery space, and restaurant complex. Since 2017, the Jersey City Theater Center performs their dance and theatre programming at White Eagle Hall.

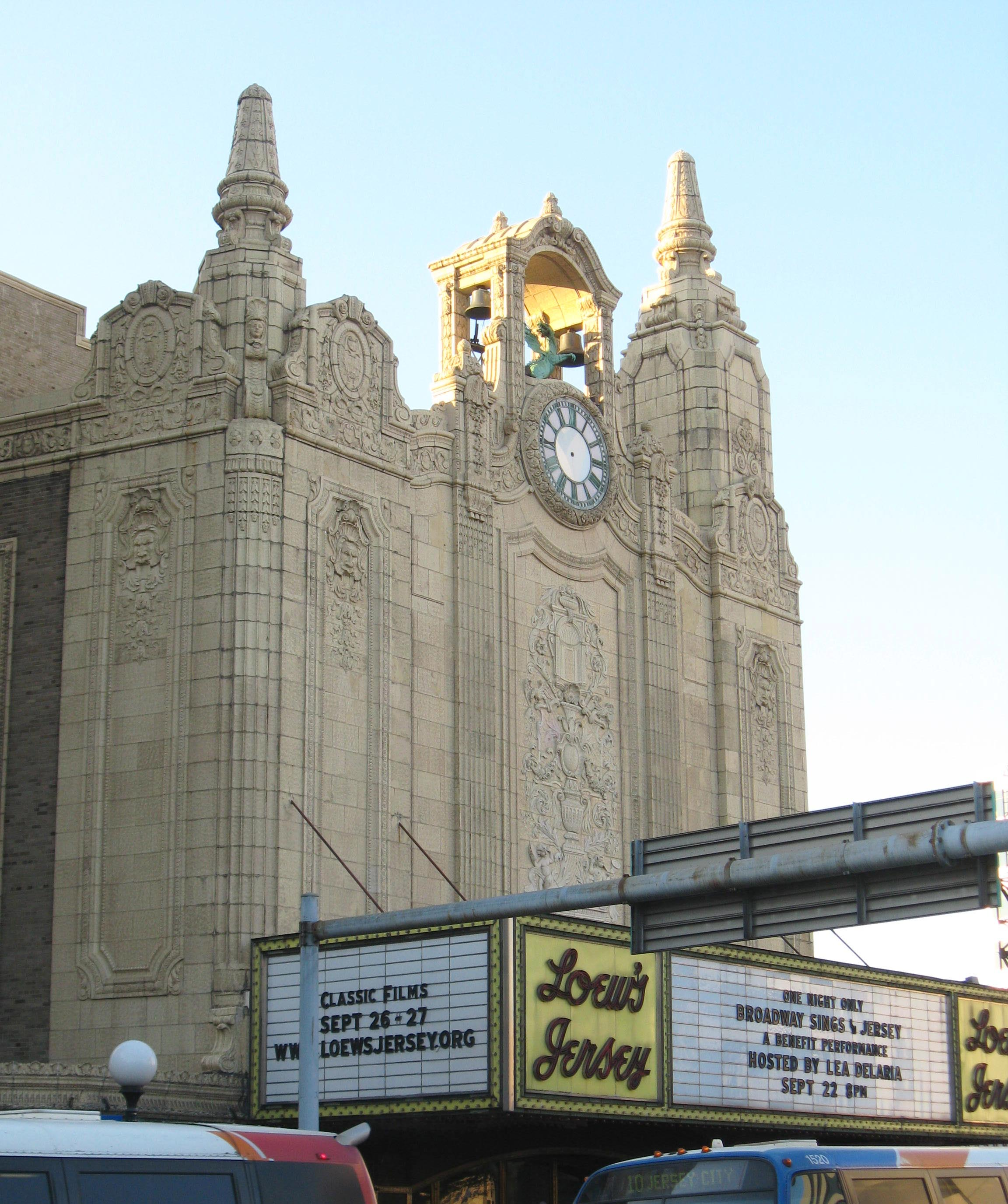
Loew's Jersey Theatre

The Loew's Jersey Theatre is a 3,500-seat historic movie palace and performing arts venue in the Journal Square neighborhood of Jersey City. It was built in 1929 and designed by the architectural firm of Rapp and Rapp. It is one of five Loew's Wonder Theatres in the New York metropolitan area and the only one built outside of New York City. When it opened it was called the "most lavish temple of music and entertainment" in New Jersey. In 2021, the theatre closed to undergo a $130 million renovation and re-opened in November 2026 as a modern performing arts venue.

Monty Hall is a live performing arts space owned and operated by WFMU 91.1FM starting in 2014 at their offices and studios at 43 Montgomery Street.

Nimbus Arts Center at The Lively opened in 2020 in the Powerhouse Arts District (PAD) as the home for Nimbus Dance Works. At 15,000 sq ft (1,400 m^{2}), the 150-seat performing arts venue hosts the organization's professional dance company, school of dance, performing arts presentations, visual arts program, and office headquarters. It is also home to Segunda Quimbamba and LUX Performing Arts.

Art House Productions Theater Center is located in the Powerhouse Arts District (PAD) and opened in 2023. The two-story facility, gallery and 99-seat black box theater was designed by nationally recognized theater architects Auerbach Consultants. The center hosts plays, comedy shows, film festivals, music performances, dance and visual arts.

The New Jersey Symphony is opening its first permanent venue in 2027 in the Powerhouse Arts District (PAD). The Symphony will be moving from its long time base of operations at the New Jersey Performing Arts Center (NJPAC) in Newark to a purpose built 550-seat theater called the "Symphony Center". The 44,000 sq ft (4,100 m^{2}) Center will be a hub for concerts, classes and other activities. While the Symphony will continue to perform across New Jersey, the theater will serve as its primary location. The center will increase its programming over a five-year period, with about 20 to 30 performances in the 2026–27 season, and rising to about 150 to 200 performances in the 2030–31 season.

Several venues at the universities in Jersey City are also used to present professional and semi-professional theater, dance, and music. Kean Jersey City features the historic 1,000 seat Margaret Williams Theatre at Hepburn Hall and the 120-seat black box West Side Theatre. Saint Peter's University features the 200-seat Roy Irving Theatre at Dinneen Hall and the 400-seat "cabaret-style" performing arts space at the Mac Mahon Student Center.

=== JCMAPS ===
Since 2013, the Jersey City Mural Arts Program (JCMAPS), has partnered with established and emerging local, national and international mural artists, such as JC based graffiti artist DISTORT, local Jersey City teachers, Brazilian artist Eduardo Kobra, and American artists and activists such as Shepard Fairey and Kyle Holbrook. The city also engages property owners throughout Jersey City as part of the innovative program that reduces graffiti, engages local residents and beautifies Jersey City by transforming the city into a vibrant outdoor art gallery. To date, over 200 murals have been created by over 138 artists.

In 2014, the Jersey City Youth Mural Arts Program (JCYMAP) started as an extension of JCMAPS. Students throughout Jersey City work together with art instructors on the final layout and design of the murals and engage in hands-on, intensive workshops that are designed to provide young artists with the tools and skills necessary to create public art. The program also works with local universities such as New Jersey City University and Saint Peter's University to engage young-adults to create a mural under the direction of professional mural artists.

=== Festivals and events ===
Jersey City is home to several annual visual and performing arts festivals, fairs, and other events. These include Jersey City Art & Studio Tour (JCAST), a city-sponsored visual art showcase founded in 1990, Art Fair 14C, a non-profit juried exhibition for New Jersey artists and New Jersey's largest visual arts event, and Your Move Modern Dance Festival, which was founded in 2010 and continues to be produced by Art House Productions. Jersey City has also hosted JC Fridays, a city-wide quarterly seasonal arts festival organized by Art House Productions each March, June, September, and December since 2006. Art House Productions also produces the Jersey City Comedy Festival (formerly known as the 6th Borough Comedy Festival), which presents stand up, improv, and sketch comedy. Since 2008, Art House Productions also hosts the annual Snow Ball Gala with a different theme every year. The gala celebrates Jersey City's vibrant arts and culture scene by honoring those who support artists and enrich Hudson County through arts programming.

Groove on Grove is a free weekly summer music series that takes place every Wednesday from May to August at Grove Street PATH Plaza.

Since 1992, the Hudson Shakespeare Company has been the resident Shakespeare festival of Hudson County performing a free Shakespeare production for each month of the summer throughout various parks in the city. The group regularly performs at Hamilton Park (9th Street & Jersey Avenue), Van Vorst Park (Jersey Avenue & Montgomery Street), and The Historic Jersey City and Harsimus Cemetery (435 Newark Avenue).

The Ghost of Uncle Joe's is an annual weekend long music festival fundraiser that takes place in October and benefits The Historic Jersey City and Harsimus Cemetery. Started in 2010 and named after Uncle Joe's, a popular former rock club in Downtown Jersey City, performances are held at the cemetery and the festival is Halloween themed and features a mix of local musicians covering well known artists and bands.

Starting in 2010, the annual Jersey City Ward Tour is a recreational cycling event that takes riders on a 16-mile (26 km) tour through all six wards of Jersey City and attracts over 3,000 cyclists. The tour is a fundraising event held by Bike JC, a nonprofit organization that advocates on making the streets safer for cyclists by promoting bike-friendly policies such as protected bike lanes and bicycle safety education.

The annual All About Downtown Street Fair, started in 2011 and hosted by the Historic Downtown Special Improvement District (HDSID), takes place in September and runs along Newark Avenue from Grove Street to Coles Street drawing thousand of people to Downtown Jersey City.

The annual Jersey City Jazz Festival, started in 2013, is the largest jazz festival in the New York metropolitan area and features performances throughout Jersey City over the course of four days. The festival has been so successful that in 2024, the Jersey City Latin Jazz Festival began as its own event. Both festivals are held at Exchange Place and are produced by Riverview Jazz, a Jersey City-based non-profit.

Jersey City hosts its annual 4th of July fireworks celebration, concert and street fair at Exchange Place. The celebration is one of the largest in the metropolitan area attracting over 100,000 people with Fireworks by Grucci over the Hudson River, Jersey City Night Market and hosting several local and international performing artists over the years such as the Village People (2016), Kool and the Gang (2017), Snoop Dogg (2018), Pitbull (2019), Akon (2018 & 2019), DJ Diesel (2022), Flo Rida (2022), Fat Joe (2024) and Wyclef Jean (2024).

Since 2015, Jersey City co-hosts New York City's annual Fleet Week celebration and festivities at Liberty State Park.

Starting in 2017, the Hudson West Music Fest is a folk music festival that takes place in September at various venues throughout the city featuring artists such as Amythyst Kiah and Dori Freeman.

The Jersey City Mural Arts Festival started in 2021 and was born out of the successful Jersey City Mural Arts Program (JCMAPS). The inaugural festival featured over 50 artists and activated more than 30 walls throughout Jersey City.

The Jersey City Marathon has been hosted annually in April since 2022. The marathon is a USA Track & Field (USATF)-certified event and course that is one the fastest and flattest in the United States. The race is a qualifying event for the Boston Marathon the following year.

Starting in 2023, Jersey City hosts its annual Juneteenth All About Us Festival at Liberty State Park having hosted performances from Musiq Soulchild (2024), Crystal Waters (2024), Robin S. (2025), Mario (2025) and Jadakiss (2025).

The city's culinary profile has risen in recent years with Jersey City hosting two annual restaurant weeks during the winter months, Hudson County Restaurant Week and Jersey City Restaurant Fest, to celebrate its local establishments.

== Parks ==
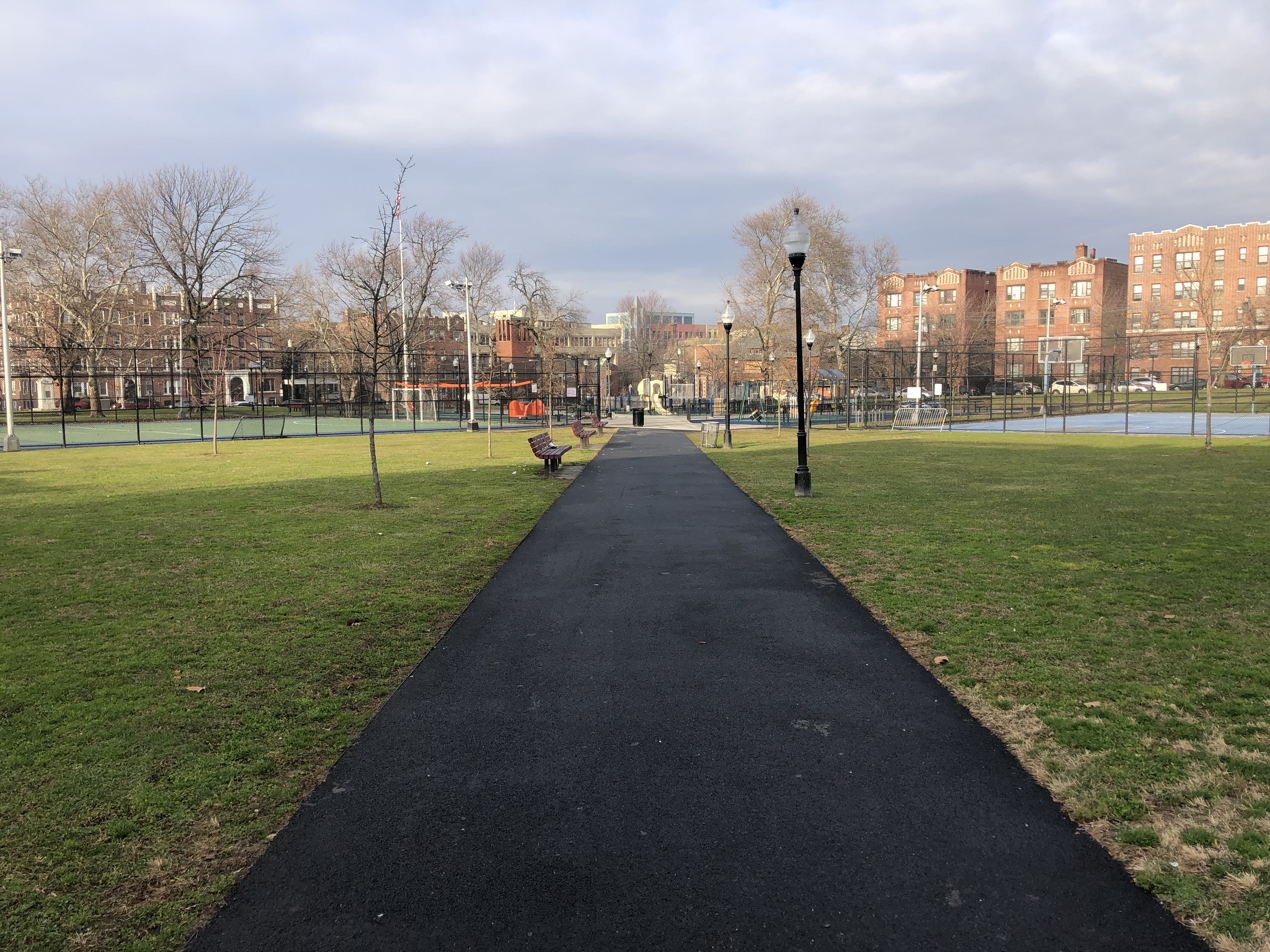
Audubon Park in the Greenville

As of 2025, Jersey City has 109 parks in total, including municipal, county, state and federal park space, with 12% of the city's land devoted to parks and recreation, compared to the national median of 15%, giving Jersey City the most park space of any city in New Jersey. Every Jersey City resident lives within a 10-minute walk of a park which is better than the national average of 57%. In 2016, Jersey City residents voted to establish the Open Space Trust Fund to support the development and maintenance of open spaces, parks, and historic sites through a municipal tax levy. Additionally the trust fund has led to investments to improve open space access, acreage, equity and amenities. These efforts have led to Jersey City being ranked 31st out of the 100 most populous cities by the 2025 Trust for Public Land Park Score.

Among the parks in the city are Berry Lane Park at 17.5 acres (7.1 ha), the largest municipal park, and Lincoln Park at 273.4 acres (110.6 ha), the largest county park. Liberty State Park at 1,212 acres (490 ha) is the largest urban park in the state and the most visited state park with approximately 4.5 million visitors each year. The Statue of Liberty National Monument, which includes Ellis Island, is owned and operated by the National Park Service and is located in New York Harbor. Along the city's eastern waterfront is the Hudson River Waterfront Walkway, an 18.5 miles (29.8 km) linear park that runs from the George Washington Bridge to the Bayonne Bridge. The Hackensack River Greenway, is a 18-mile (29 km) walkway being developed along the county's western waterfront with completed segments at Droyer's Point, Lincoln Park, and Skyway Park.

== In media ==
=== Newspapers & other news outlets ===
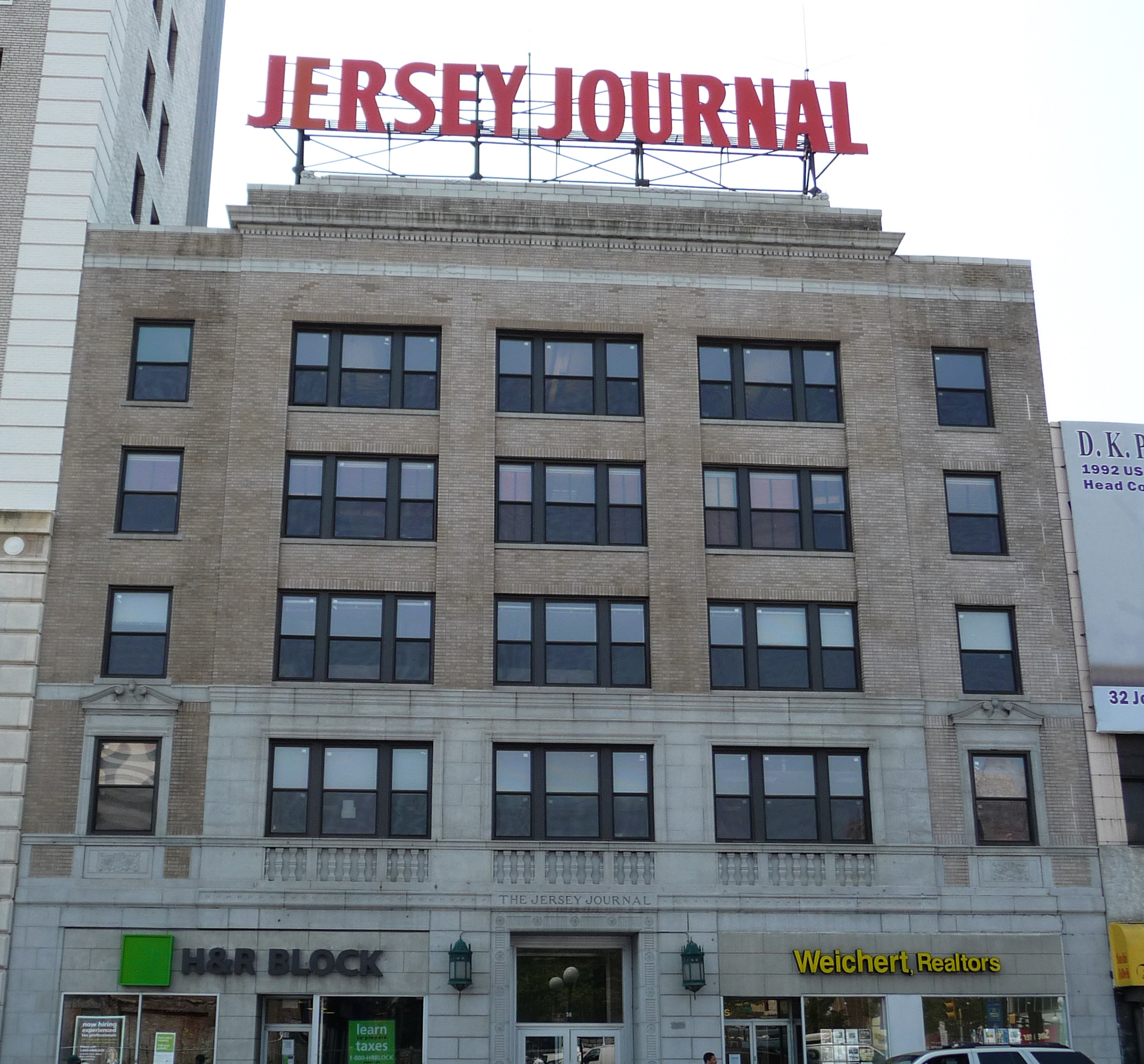
The Jersey Journal's former headquarters at 30 Journal Square

Jersey City is located in the New York media market, and most of its daily papers are available for sale or delivery such as The New York Times and the Daily News, which maintained its extensive publishing and distribution facilities at Liberty Industrial Park from 1993 to 2022.

As of 2025, Jersey City no longer has a daily print newspaper. The city's former daily newspaper since 1867, The Jersey Journal, formerly located at its namesake Journal Square, covered Hudson County and was its morning daily before ceasing publication in 2025. The Hudson Dispatch merged with the Jersey Journal in 1991.

The Jersey City Reporter is part of The Hudson Reporter group of local weeklies and is an online-only news outlet since ceasing physical publication in 2023. The River View Observer is another weekly published in the city and distributed throughout the county. Another countywide weekly, El Especialito, also serves the city.

NJ.com, provided by NJ Advance Media, covers news in Jersey City and Hudson County. The Jersey City Times began in 2019 as an online-only news outlet dedicated to in-depth coverage of Jersey City. Hudson County View is an online-only news outlet the covers Jersey City and Hudson County.

The Jersey City Independent was a former online newspaper covering Jersey City and surrounding municipalities. It also published JCI Magazine, a print quarterly magazine.

=== Radio ===
WSNR 620 AM is a commercial radio station owned by Gregory Davidzon and Sam Katsman and licensed to Jersey City.

WFMU 91.1 FM (WMFU 90.1 FM in the Hudson Valley), the longest-running freeform radio station in the United States, moved to Jersey City in 1998.

=== Literature ===
- The 1971 young-Adult fiction novel, Then Again, Maybe I Won't, by Judy Blume is a coming of age story set in Jersey City.
- Jersey City is the inspiration for the fictional New Jersey city of "Dempsey" in the 1992 crime novel, Clockers, by Richard Price.
- The city is the setting for 1993 novel, Lost in Jersey City, by Paula Sharp.
- Jersey City is the hometown of the fictional Marvel Comics superhero Kamala Khan, an incarnation of Ms. Marvel. The high school she attends, "Coles Academic", is based on Dr. Ronald E. McNair Academic High School located on Coles Street.
- Jersey City is featured in the 2020 urban fantasy novel, The City We Became, by N. K. Jemisin. In the novel, the character of Veneza is the human avatar that represents Jersey City and becomes the honorary "sixth borough" of New York City. Jersey City is also featured in the 2022 concluding novel, The World We Make.

=== Television and film ===
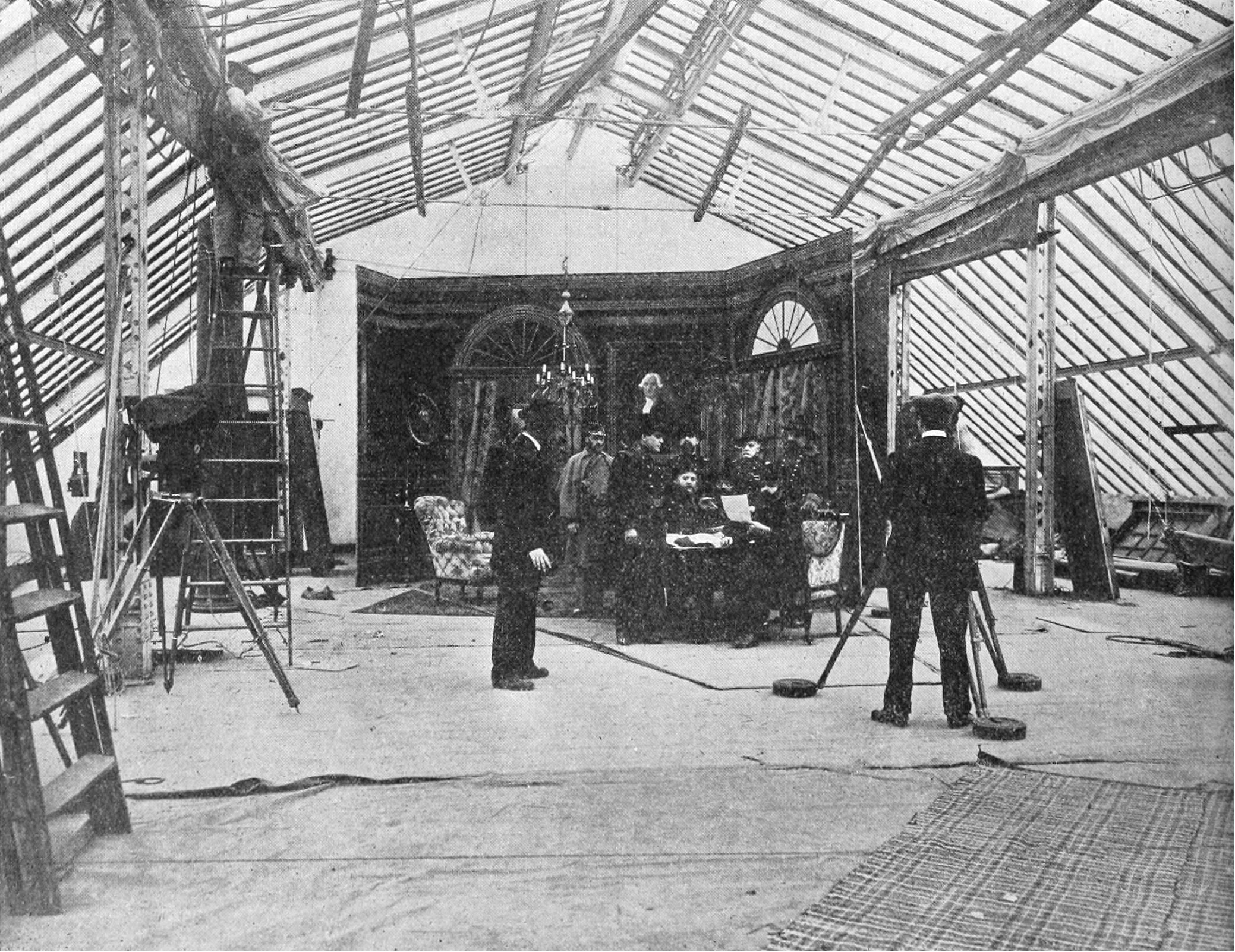
Filming at the Pathé American studio in Jersey City Heights (1912)

Jersey City has a long history with the film and television industry dating back to its early days.

Studios

The first film studio in the city was built in 1910 in the Jersey City Heights by film production company Pathé Exchange as an outgrowth of the birth of the motion picture industry in Fort Lee at the turn of the 20th century. The most successful film series produced by the studio was The Perils of Pauline starring Pearl White in 1914. The term "cliffhanger" is thought to have originated with the series due to a number of episodes filmed on or around the New Jersey Palisades. Additionally, the hero or heroine was sometimes hanging from the Palisade cliffs, seemingly with no way out, until the next episode.

The Frederick Douglass Film Company was a production company established in 1916 in Lafayette by two prominent residents, Dr. George E. Cannon and Rev. Dr. W.S. Smith of Monumental Baptist Church. Named after the African-American abolitionist Frederick Douglass, the company was founded to produce films to counter the negativity from anti-African-American films such as The Birth of a Nation (1915), the stereotypical images of Black entertainers in comedic roles and to improve race relations. The company produced three films, The Colored American Winning His Suit (1916), The Scapegoat (1917) and Heroic Negro Soldiers of the World War (1919).

The Jersey City Armory has been used as a temporary film studio due to its large floor space and ceiling height for several film projects, including Chazz Palminteri's A Bronx Tale, the Faye Dunaway thriller Eyes Of Laura Mars, Laura Brannigan's music video "Self-Control", Woody Allen's Deconstructing Harry, Terry Kinney's Diminished Capacity, A Perfect Murder by Andrew Davis and Jim Jarmusch's Ghost Dog: The Way of the Samurai.

Parlay Studios is Jersey City's longest-serving film studio since it opened in The Heights in 2005. It is now located on the campus of Mana Contemporary and features over 80,000 square feet (7,400 m^{2}) of space across three soundstages, three studios, production offices and flex and support spaces.

In 2021, Cinelease Studios-Caven Point opened as the second-largest film studio in the State of New Jersey. The studio has three soundstages totaling 112,400 square feet (10,440 m^{2}) that are 40 feet (12 m) high to the grid and 50 feet (15 m) to the ceiling. In 2023, the Cinelease announced they are planning to double the number of soundstages with a 76,649 square feet (7,120.9 m^{2}) expansion that will include three new stages.

Festivals

Jersey City has hosted several film festivals over the years. The annual Golden Door Film Festival has taken place at various venues throughout Jersey City since 2011, including the Loew's Jersey Theatre, and is the city's longest running film festival. The Brightside Film Festival has been held at the Brightside Tavern since 2014 and is an annual festival that features short films. The Jersey City Horror Film Festival (JCHFF) began as the Jersey City Popup Film Festival in 2015 and is designed to be a fun and relaxed film festival, offering quality independent films. The Thomas Edison Film Festival (TEFF) began as the "Black Maria Film Festival" in 1981 as a project of the Thomas A. Edison Media Arts Consortium, an independent non-profit organization originally based at the Media Arts Department at New Jersey City University (NJCU) and was held a Hepburn Hall. The consortium has since moved operations to the Hoboken Historical Museum in neighboring Hoboken and now shows films across New Jersey, the United States and abroad.

Jersey City has been referenced in and the backdrop and location of several movies, television shows and music videos over the years.

- In the 1950 biopic The Jackie Robinson Story, starring Jackie Robinson and partially based on his autobiography, My Own Story, his historic professional debut with the Montreal Royals in Jersey City is first depicted with Gilmore Field standing in for Roosevelt Stadium.
- In 1968, the film Funny Girl shot the "Don't Rain on My Parade" sequence in the Central Railroad of New Jersey Terminal at Liberty State Park in Jersey City.
- In the 1972 film, The Godfather, the scene featuring Peter Clemenza and Rocco Lampone's famous exchange, "Leave the gun. Take the cannoli", was filmed at the site that became Freedom Way in Liberty State Park in Jersey City.
- The 1984 superhero film, The Toxic Avenger, features a car chase scene that was filmed throughout Downtown Jersey City.
- The music video for the 1985 single "Minus Zero" by the Polish band Lady Pank, features Jersey City as a backdrop.
- The 1986 biopic, Sid and Nancy, filmed the movie's final scenes along the waterfront at Exchange Place with the Hudson and Manhattan Railroad Powerhouse in the final shot.
- The 1989 film Bloodhounds of Broadway, which starred Madonna, Matt Dillon, and Jennifer Grey, was partially filmed in Jersey City.
- In the 1992 "Black Hole" episode of The Ren and Stimpy Show, Commander Höek and Space Cadet Stimpy get sucked into a black hole and end up on a strange world. In order to escape they need catch a bus that is headed for Jersey City.
- In the 1994 historical drama Quiz Show, the Art Deco Murdoch Hall at The Beacon (former Jersey City Medical Center) portrays NBC's Rockefeller Center as both complex's share many architectural similarities.
- The 1995 comedy film To Wong Foo, Thanks for Everything! Julie Newmar, filmed the opening restaurant scenes at the former landmark Canton Restaurant in Journal Square.
- In 1997, the film Men in Black depicts a scene where Agent J delivers a newborn alien squid on Morris Pesin Drive in Liberty State Park.
- The 1998 film Godzilla, filmed in the Paulus Hook neighborhood with the movies' military headquarters set at Essex and Hudson Streets.
- The HBO crime drama The Sopranos filmed at several locations throughout Jersey City during its run from 1999 to 2007 and featured landmarks such as the Jersey City and Harsimus Cemetery as the Soprano family cemetery.
- The 2004 animated television series Megas XLR is set in Jersey City and features mechanic Coop and his best friend Jamie who find a mecha robot from the future at a local junkyard.
- The 2005 political thriller The Interpreter, filmed several important scenes at the campus of Saint Peter's University.
- The 2009 NBC medical drama Mercy was set and filmed in Jersey City and featured the fictional "Mercy Hospital".
- Jersey City was the filming location for the debut season of the 2012 reality television series Snooki & JWoww, a spinoff of Jersey Shore that starred Nicole "Snooki" Polizzi and Jennifer "JWoww" Farley living downtown at a former firehouse at 38 Mercer Street.
- In the 2013 biopic sports film 42, Jackie Robinson's historic professional debut with the Montreal Royals in Jersey City is depicted with Luther Williams Field doubling as Roosevelt Stadium.
- The final scenes of the 2014 adaptation of Annie were shot at Liberty State Park in Jersey City.
- The 2018 Netflix series Seven Seconds, starring Regina King, is set in Jersey City and the bicycle accident at the center of the plot of Season 1 occurs at Liberty State Park.
- The 2019 film Joker, based on the DC Comics supervillain, was filmed in Jersey City while depicting it as Gotham City. The historic Hudson County Courthouse is depicted as "Wayne Hall" where Arthur Fleck (Joker) confronts Thomas Wayne and the historic Loew's Jersey Theatre is depicted as the theatre where Bruce Wayne witnesses a criminal murder his parents.
- Jersey City has been featured in the Marvel Cinematic Universe (MCU) in the 2022 Disney+ miniseries Ms. Marvel and in the 2023 film The Marvels. Jersey City was referenced in the 2025 Disney+ series Daredevil: Born Again with Matt Murdock/Daredevil saying he prefers Jersey City to Hoboken.
- The 2022 rom-com, Bros, was filmed in the Village section of Downtown Jersey City and at White Eagle Hall.
- The 2022 coming-of-age drama film, Armageddon Time, inspired by director, writer and producer James Gray's experience growing up in Queens was filmed throughout Jersey City and features portrayals of Fred Trump and Maryanne Trump Barry.
- The 2022 biopic The Greatest Beer Run Ever, produced by Jersey City resident Andrew Muscato, was shot throughout the city, with Van Vorst Park serving as the site of Vietnam War protests and an argument between the main character, Chickie, and his sister.
- The 2023 comedy drama film, Ezra is set in New Jersey and was filmed in the city's Bergen-Lafayette neighborhood featuring Robert De Niro, Whoopi Goldberg and Bobby Cannavale.
- The 2024 post apocalyptic AMC miniseries, The Walking Dead: The Ones Who Live, was filmed in and around Hamilton Park with the park being renamed Millennium Park.
- The 2024 film, It Ends with Us, was shot on location at the Newport waterfront, the Newark Avenue pedestrian plaza and the Van Vorst Park neighborhood with Jersey City portraying Boston.
- The 2024 Bob Dylan biopic, A Complete Unknown, was extensively shot at multiple locations and businesses in Jersey City with the Van Vorst Park neighborhood around Jersey Avenue portraying Manhattan's West Village.
- The 2025 biopic Nonnas, was filmed in the Downtown and Greenville neighborhoods with Jersey City portraying Brooklyn and Staten Island.

== Government ==
=== Local ===
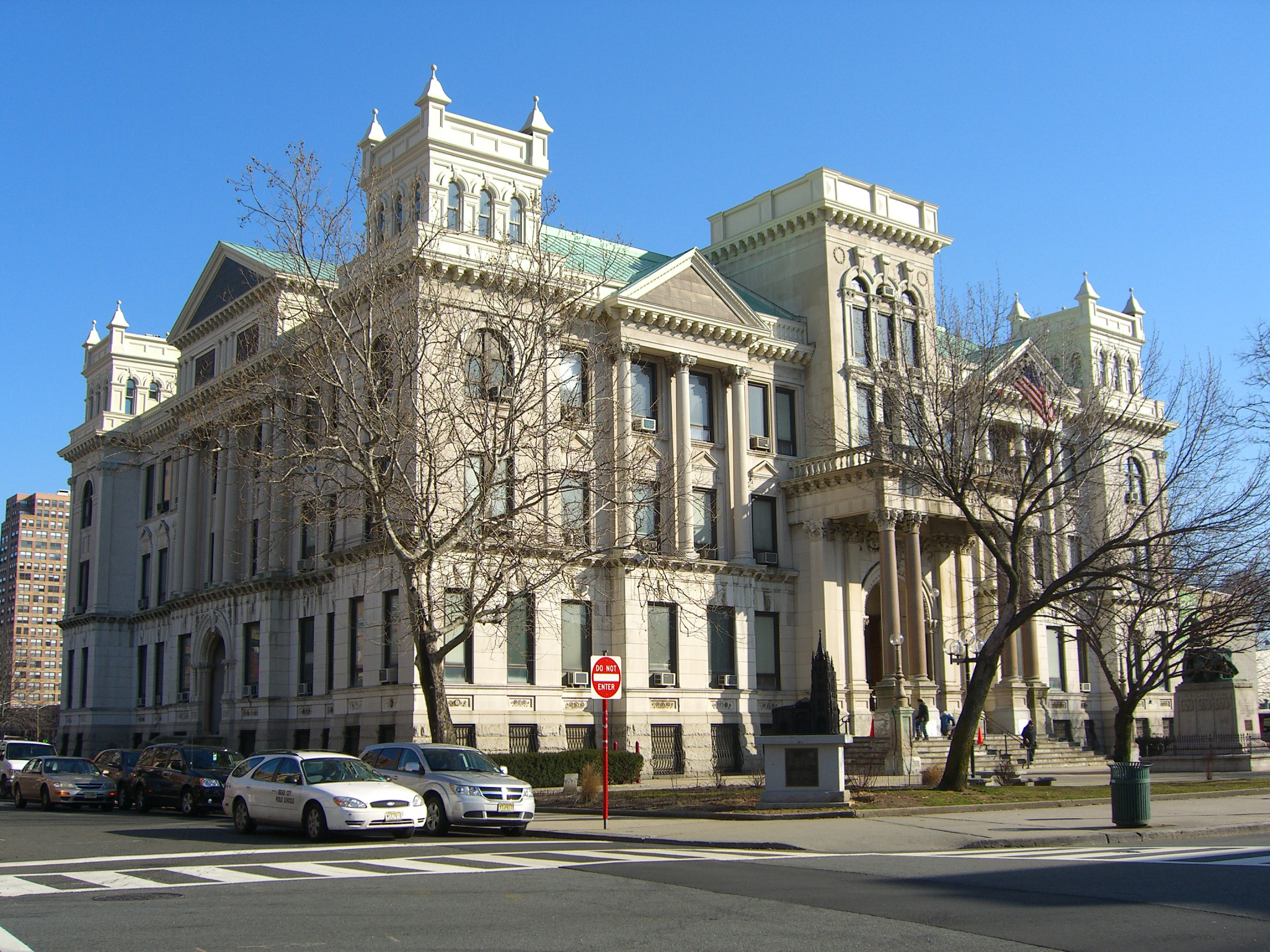
City Hall, on Grove Street

Jersey City is governed under the Faulkner Act (mayor–council) form of municipal government. The city is one of 71 municipalities (of the 564) statewide that use this form of government. The governing body is comprised of the mayor and the nine-member city council. The city council has six members elected from wards and three elected at-large, all elected to concurrent four-year terms on a non-partisan basis as part of the November general election. Ward boundaries were redrawn based on the results of the 2020 United States census to rebalance wards based on population changes. The redistricting after the 2020 census led to some controversy.

As of 2026, the mayor is James Solomon, whose term of office ends December 31, 2029. Members of the city council are Council President Denise Ridley (Ward A – Greenville), Council President Pro Tempore Frank E. Gilmore (Ward F – Bergen/Lafayette), Joel Brooks (Ward B – West Side), Jake Ephros (Ward D – The Heights), Michael Griffin (at-large), Rolando Lavarro (at-large), Eleana Little (Ward E – Downtown), Mamta Singh (at-large) and Thomas Zuppa (Ward C – Journal Square), all of whom are serving concurrent terms of office that end December 31, 2029.

Keshav Poddar was appointed by Solomon to serve as deputy mayor housing and economic development, but resigned in October 2026. Dia Bryant was selected as deputy mayor for education.

The business administrator is Ruby B. Choi and the city clerk is Sean J. Gallagher.

=== Federal, state, and county representation ===
==== Hudson County ====
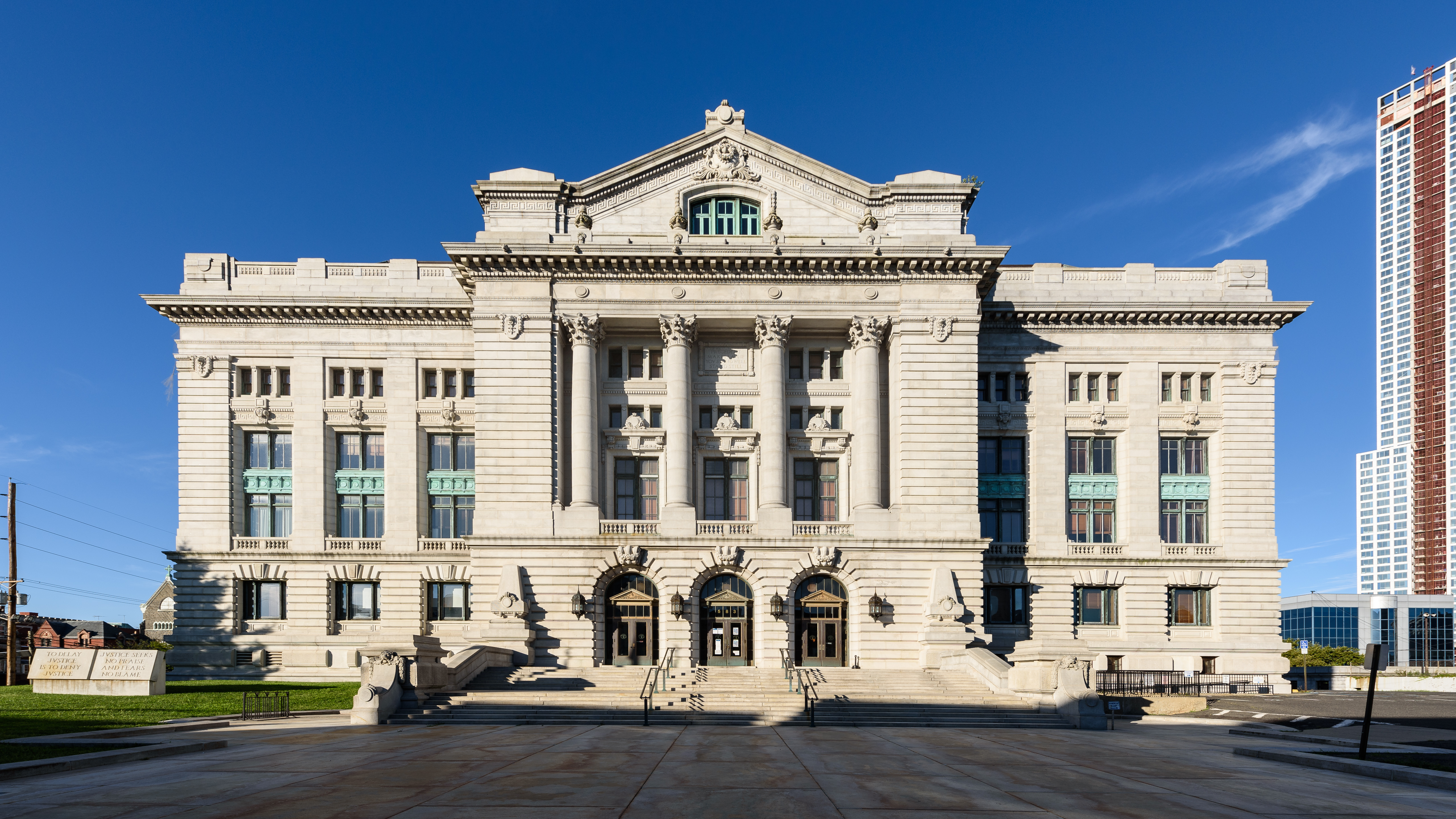
Hudson County Courthouse on Newark Avenue

Jersey City is located in Hudson County. The county is governed by the directly elected Hudson County Executive, Democrat Craig Guy, and by a Board of County Commissioners, which serves as the county's legislative body.

==== New Jersey Legislature ====
Jersey City is located in New Jersey's 31st and 32nd legislative districts covering the southern and northern halves of the city, respectively. It is represented by four assembly members and two senators in the New Jersey Legislature. Prior to the 2011 reapportionment following the 2010 census, Jersey City had been in the 31st, 32nd and the 33rd state legislative districts.

New Jersey Senate
| District | Name | Assumed office | Party affiliation |
|---|---|---|---|
| 31 | Angela V. McKnight | 2024 | Democratic |
| 32 | Raj Mukherji | 2024 | Democratic |

New Jersey General Assembly
| District | Name | Assumed office | Party affiliation |
|---|---|---|---|
| 31 | William Sampson | 2022 | Democratic |
| 31 | Jerry Walker | 2026 | Democratic |
| 32 | Ravi Bhalla | 2026 | Democratic |
| 32 | Katie Brennan | 2026 | Democratic |

==== United States Congress ====
Jersey City lies within New Jersey's 8th Congressional District and 10th Congressional District. There are 138,371 residents in the 8th District and 154,819 in the 10th District. Prior to the 2010 census, Jersey City had been split between the 9th Congressional District, 10th Congressional District and the 13th Congressional District, a change made by the New Jersey Redistricting Commission that took effect in January 2013, based on the results of the November 2012 general elections. The split, which went into effect in 2013, placed 111,678 residents living in the city's north and east in the 8th District, while 139,519 residents in the southwest portion of the city were placed in the 10th District.

For the 119th United States Congress, New Jersey's 8th congressional district is represented by Rob Menendez (D, Jersey City). For the 119th United States Congress, New Jersey's 10th congressional district is represented by LaMonica McIver (D, Newark). New Jersey is represented in the United States Senate by Democrats Cory Booker (Newark, term ends 2027) and Andy Kim (Moorestown, term ends 2031).

=== Politics ===
As of March 23, 2011, there was a total of 120,229 registered voters in Jersey City, of whom 58,194 (48.4%) were registered as Democrats, 7,655 (6.4%) were registered as Republicans, and 54,293 (45.2%) were registered as Unaffiliated. There were 87 voters registered to other parties.

Gubernatorial election results for Jersey City
| Year | Republican | | Democratic | | Third party(ies) | |
| Year | No. | % | No. | % | No. | % |
|---|---|---|---|---|---|---|
| 2025 | 10,499 | 16.22% | 53,108 | 82.04% | 1,124 | 1.74% |
| 2021 | 7,636 | 17.00% | 36,592 | 81.46% | 692 | 1.54% |
| 2017 | 4,837 | 11.95% | 34,659 | 85.61% | 988 | 2.44% |
| 2013 | 9,784 | 31.85% | 20,421 | 66.48% | 514 | 1.67% |
| 2009 | 7,336 | 18.91% | 29,817 | 76.87% | 1,634 | 4.21% |
| 2005 | 6,368 | 16.22% | 32,062 | 81.65% | 838 | 2.13% |

In the 2012 presidential election, Democrat Barack Obama received 85.5% of the vote (64,052 cast), ahead of Republican Mitt Romney with 13.5% (10,120 votes), and other candidates with 1.0% (751 votes), among the 75,506 ballots cast by the city's 133,197 registered voters (583 ballots were spoiled), for a turnout of 56.7%. In the 2008 presidential election, Democrat Barack Obama received 81.8% of the vote (65,780 cast), ahead of Republican John McCain with 16.8% (13,529 votes) and other candidates with 0.7% (584 votes), among the 80,381 ballots cast by the city's 139,158 registered voters, for a turnout of 57.8%. In the 2004 presidential election, Democrat John Kerry received 74.5% of the vote (52,979 ballots cast), out polling Republican George W. Bush with 22.8% (16,216 votes) and other candidates with 0.5% (559 votes), among the 71,130 ballots cast by the city's 119,723 registered voters, for a turnout percentage of 59.4.

Presidential Elections Results
| Year | Republican | Democratic | Third Parties |
|---|---|---|---|
| 2024 | 23.8% 21,236 | 72.6% 64,749 | 3.6% 2,767 |
| 2020 | 17.3% 17,032 | 79.3% 78,209 | 3.4% 1,006 |
| 2016 | 14.2% 10,735 | 82.7% 62,319 | 2.7% 2,014 |
| 2012 | 13.5% 10,120 | 85.5% 64,052 | 1.0% 751 |
| 2008 | 16.8% 13,259 | 81.8% 65,780 | 0.7% 584 |
| 2004 | 22.8%, 16,216 | 74.5%, 52,979 | 0.5%, 559 |

In the 2013 gubernatorial election, Democrat Barbara Buono received 66.5% of the vote (20,421 cast), ahead of Republican Chris Christie with 31.8% (9,784 votes), and other candidates with 1.7% (514 votes), among the 32,347 ballots cast by the city's 139,265 registered voters (1,628 ballots were spoiled), for a turnout of 23.2%. In the 2009 gubernatorial election, Democrat Jon Corzine received 76.2% of the vote (29,817 ballots cast), ahead of Republican Chris Christie with 18.7% (7,336 votes), Independent Chris Daggett with 3.2% (1,263 votes) and other candidates with 0.9% (371 votes), among the 39,143 ballots cast by the city's 120,269 registered voters, yielding a 32.5% turnout.

United States Senate election results for Jersey City1
| Year | Republican | | Democratic | | Third party(ies) | |
| Year | No. | % | No. | % | No. | % |
|---|---|---|---|---|---|---|
| 2024 | 16,708 | 20.76% | 60,177 | 74.77% | 3,596 | 4.47% |
| 2018 | 8,194 | 13.84% | 49,242 | 83.15% | 1,786 | 3.02% |
| 2012 | 8,077 | 12.24% | 56,469 | 85.57% | 1,447 | 2.19% |
| 2006 | 6,975 | 18.13% | 30,849 | 80.16% | 658 | 1.71% |

United States Senate election results for Jersey City2
| Year | Republican | | Democratic | | Third party(ies) | |
| Year | No. | % | No. | % | No. | % |
|---|---|---|---|---|---|---|
| 2020 | 14,952 | 16.07% | 75,512 | 81.17% | 2,560 | 2.75% |
| 2014 | 3,835 | 12.96% | 25,108 | 84.84% | 653 | 2.21% |
| 2013 | 3,042 | 13.52% | 19,205 | 85.38% | 246 | 1.09% |
| 2008 | 10,018 | 15.75% | 51,878 | 81.57% | 1,705 | 2.68% |

=== Public safety ===
- The Jersey City Fire Department (JCFD) has 667 uniformed firefighters and is the state's largest municipal fire department. Established as a volunteer department in 1829, the department became a paid professional organization in 1871. Jersey City is a member of the Metro USAR Strike Team, which consists of nine North Jersey fire departments. Jersey City has the only High-Rise Firefighting Unit in the state, known as "Squad 1."
- The Jersey City Police Department (JCPD) has more than 950 sworn officers. The creation of the department dates back to 1829 with the first appointment of watchmen. The Patrol Division is divided into four districts for the north, east, west and south areas of the city. In 2024, the city opened the Public Safety De-Escalation and Training Center, which features multiple training centers including a 360-degree training simulator, tactical training rooms, two firearm qualification ranges and five classrooms. Additionally, residents and community partners are invited to participate in training at the new building to better understand emergency responses.
- Emergency Medical Services (EMS) are provided by the Jersey City Medical Center under RWJBarnabas Health with a 22,000 square feet (2,000 m^{2}) headquarters located a short distance from the Medical Center.
- The Jersey City 911 Call Center is based at the city's Public Safety Headquarters. In 2026, the city upgraded the 911 system to enable digital audio and verified location-based call routing. Callers can exchange text messages with operators, including photos and videos.

== Education ==
=== Colleges and universities ===
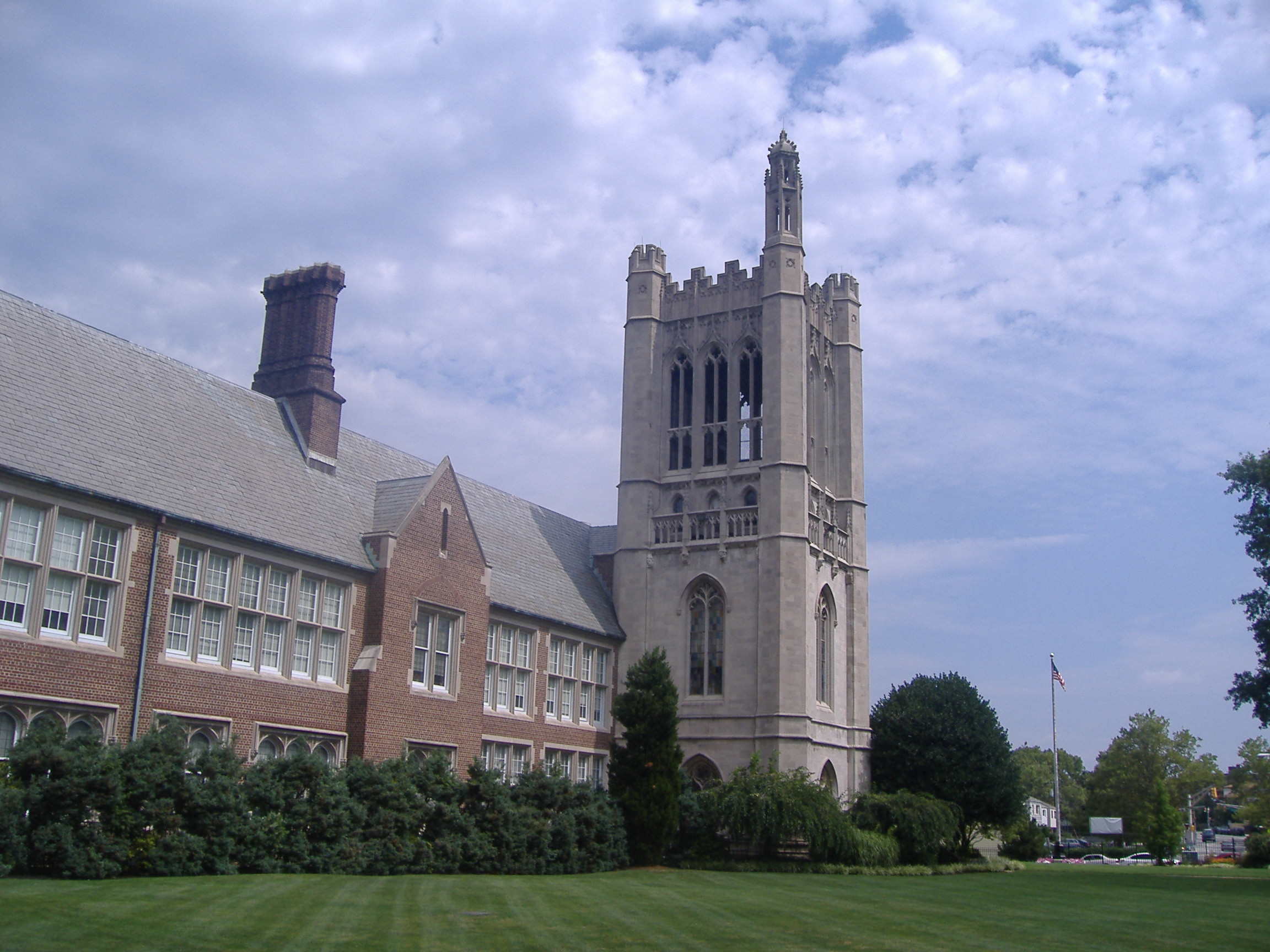
Hepburn Hall at Kean Jersey City

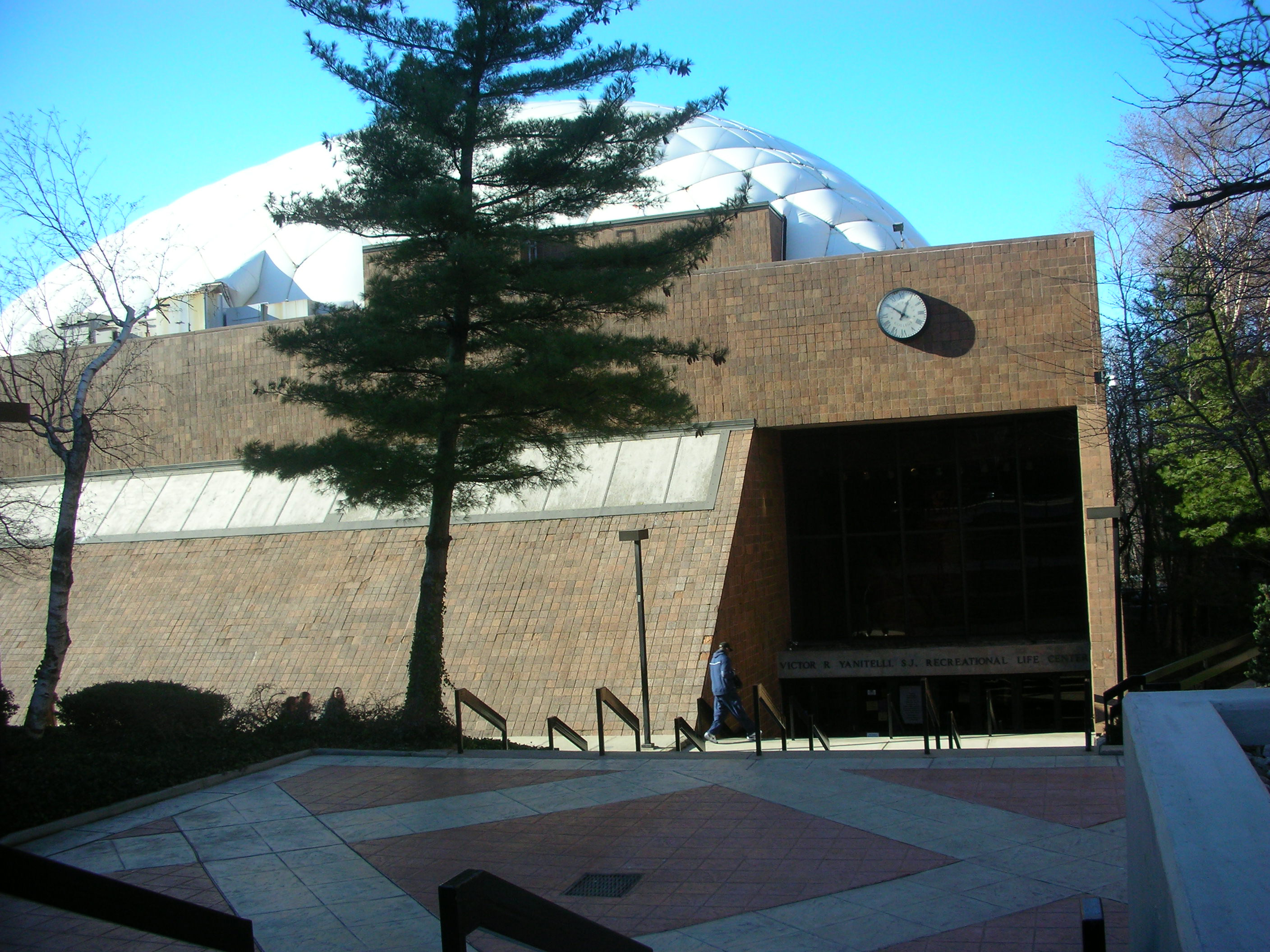
The Yanitelli Center on the campus of Saint Peter's University

Jersey City is home to several institutions of higher education.

Kean Jersey City is a state public university on the West Side of the city that is part of Kean University. Formerly known as New Jersey City University (NJCU), the school was chartered in 1927 as "New Jersey State Normal School at Jersey City", it originally specialized in teacher education and first awarded a Bachelor of Science degree in education. A. Harry Moore School school opened in the 1930s as one of the first public schools in the United States specifically constructed for students with multiple disabilities. Since 1963, the school is part of the Kean Jersey City campus and is a laboratory school for its Special Education program.

Saint Peter's University is a private Jesuit university on the West Side of Jersey City. It was founded as "Saint Peter's College" by the Society of Jesus in 1872 as a liberal arts college in the Paulus Hook neighborhood.

Hudson County Community College, established in 1974 as the first "contract" college in New Jersey, is a public community college located on an urban-style campus in Journal Square offering courses to help students transition into a larger university.

Rutgers University offers MBA classes through the Rutgers Business School at Harborside Financial Center.

New Jersey Institute of Technology (NJIT) offers M.S. programs in artificial intelligence, computer science, data science and cyber security at the Ying Wu College of Computing at 101 Hudson Street at Exchange Place.

=== Public schools ===
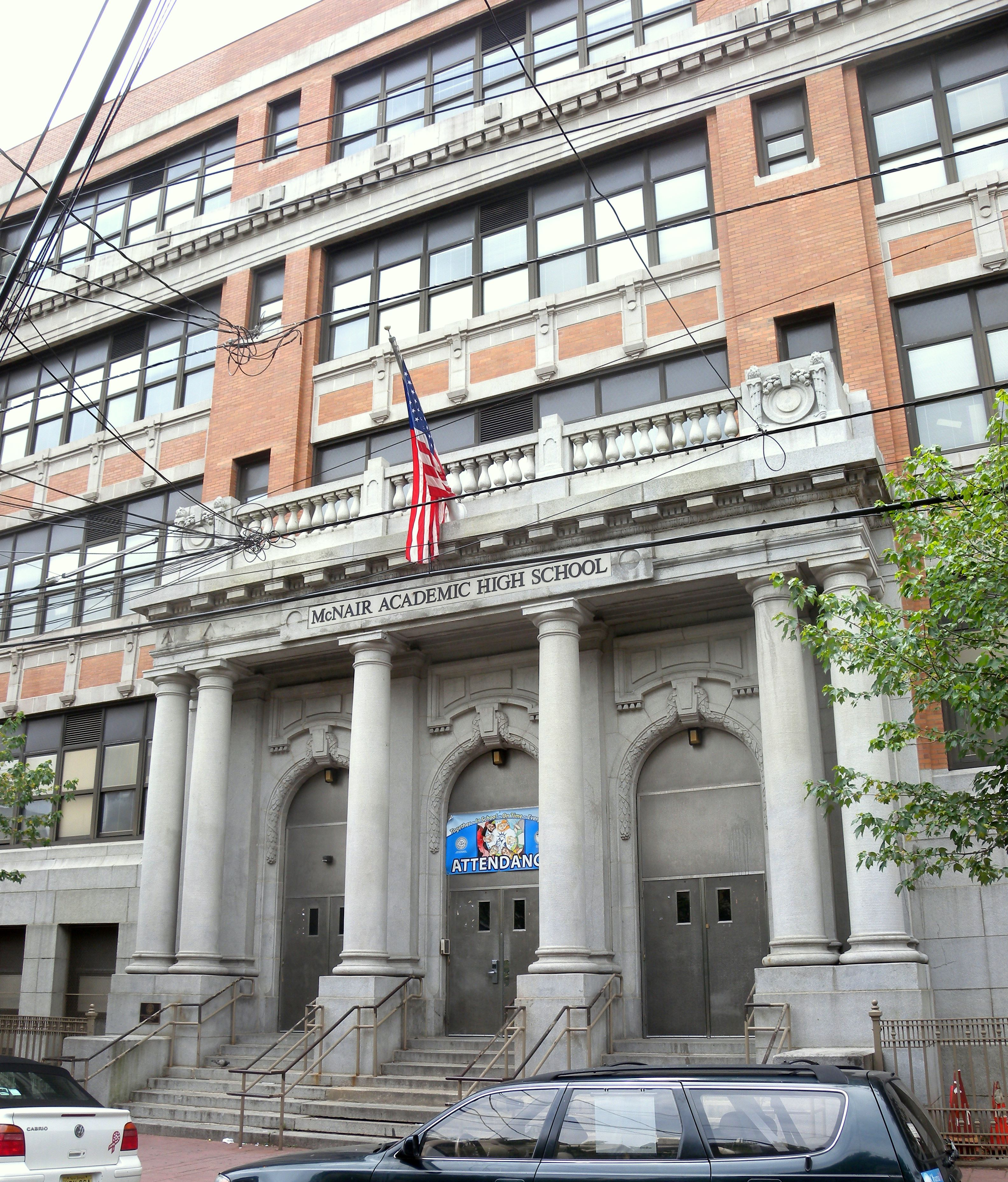
Dr. Ronald E. McNair Academic High School

The Jersey City Public Schools serve students in pre-kindergarten through twelfth grade. The district is one of 31 former Abbott districts statewide that were established pursuant to the decision by the New Jersey Supreme Court in Abbott v. Burke. These are now referred to as "SDA Districts" based on the requirement for the state to cover all costs for school building and renovation projects in these districts under the supervision of the New Jersey Schools Development Authority. As of the 2021–22 school year, the district, comprised 39 schools, had an enrollment of 27,134 students and 2,110.8 classroom teachers (on an FTE basis), for a student–teacher ratio of 12.9:1.

High schools in the district (with 2021–22 enrollment data from the National Center for Education Statistics) are William L. Dickinson High School Academy of the Sciences (2,046; 9–12), James J. Ferris High School Academy of International Enterprise (1,292; 9–12), Infinity Institute (485; 6–12), Innovation High School (286; 9–12), Liberty High School (210; 9–12), Lincoln High School Academy of Governance and Social Sciences (949; 9–12), Dr. Ronald E. McNair Academic High School (704; 9–12), Renaissance Institute (NA; 9–12) and Henry Snyder High School Academy of the Arts (800; 9–12).

Dr. Ronald E. McNair Academic High School was the first-ranked public high school in New Jersey out of 322 schools statewide, in New Jersey Monthly magazine's September 2010 cover story on the state's "Top Public High Schools", after being ranked second in 2008 out of 316 schools. and was selected as 41st best high school in the United States in Newsweek magazine's national 2011 survey. William L. Dickinson High School is the oldest high school in the city and one of the largest schools in Hudson County in terms of student population. Opened in 1906 as the Jersey City High School it is one of the oldest school sites in the city, it is a four-story Beaux-Arts building located on a hilltop facing the Hudson River.

Among Jersey City's elementary and middle schools is Academy I Middle School and Frank R. Conwell Middle School #4, which is part of the Academic Enrichment Program for Gifted Students. Another school is Alexander D. Sullivan P.S. #30, an ESL magnet school in the Greenville district, which serves nearly 800 Pre-k through 5th grade students.

The Hudson County Schools of Technology (which also has campuses in North Bergen and Secaucus) has a campus in Jersey City, which includes County Prep High School.

Jersey City also has 12 charter schools, which are run under a special charter granted by the Commissioner of the New Jersey Department of Education, including the Mathematics, Engineering, Technology and Science Charter School (for grades 6–12) and the Dr. Lena Edwards Charter School (for K–8), which were approved in January 2011. BelovED Community Charter School opened in 2012.

=== Private schools ===
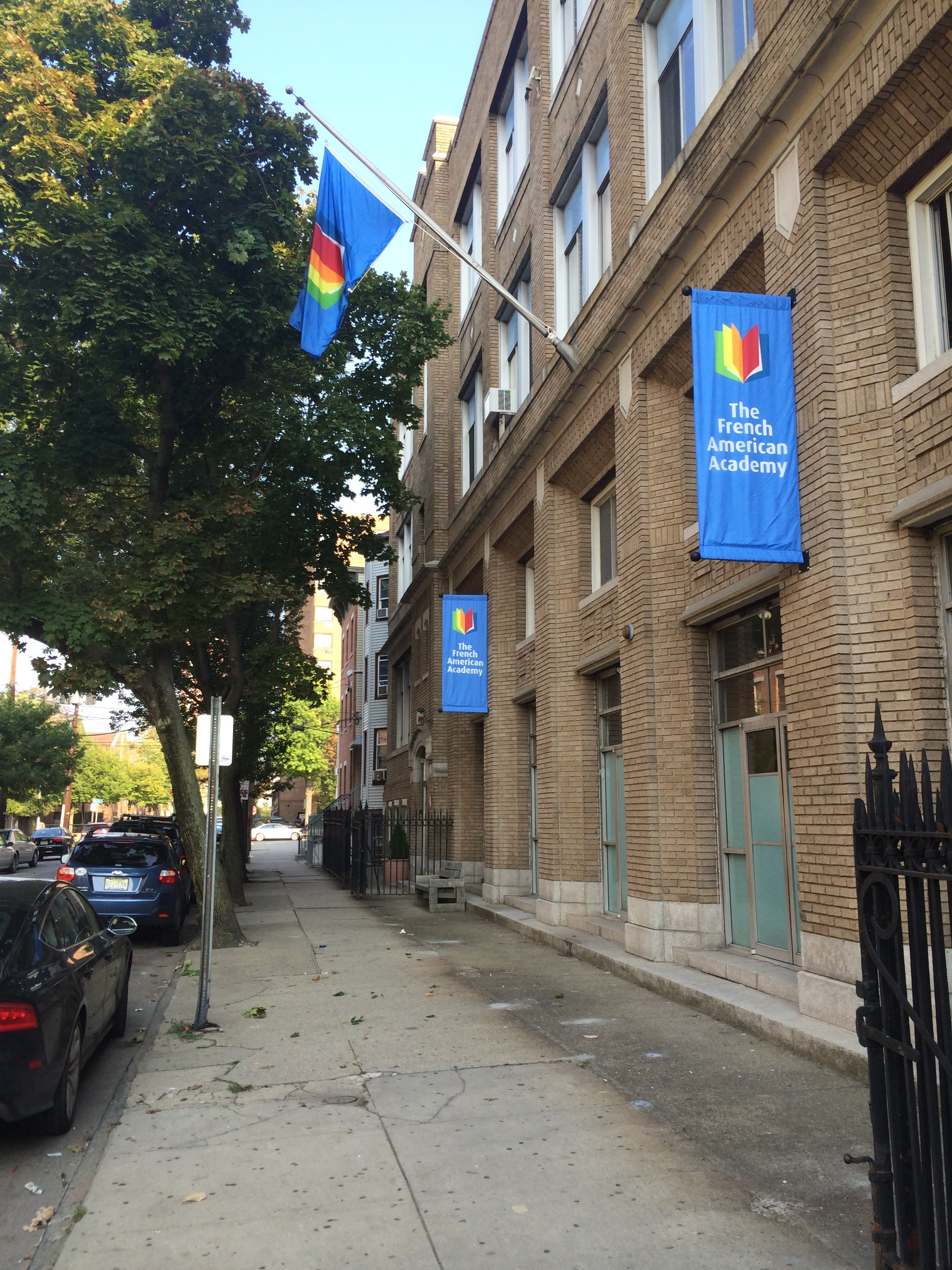
French American Academy on 3rd Street

==== Catholic schools ====
The Roman Catholic Archdiocese of Newark maintains a network of elementary and secondary Catholic schools that serve every area of Jersey City. Hudson Catholic Regional High School is operated by the Archdiocese, while Saint Dominic Academy and St. Peter's Preparatory School are private, religiously affiliated schools. St. Mary High School closed in June 2011 due to declining enrollment. St. Anthony High School, a prep basketball powerhouse known for its success under Bob Hurley and his 26 state championships in 39 years as a coach, closed in June 2017 due to declining funding and enrollment.

Catholic K-8 elementary schools include Our Lady of Czestochowa School, Sacred Heart School, Saint Aloysius Elementary Academy, St. Joseph School and St. Nicholas School. In 2015, Our Lady of Czestochowa School was one of 15 schools in New Jersey, and one of six private schools, recognized as a National Blue Ribbon School in the exemplary high performing category by the United States Department of Education.

In the face of declining enrollment and rising expenses, the Newark Archdiocese closed Our Lady of Mercy Academy (founded in 1964) and Resurrection School at the end of the 2012–13 school year. St. Anne School closed at the end of the 2011–12 school year after 112 years, as enrollment declined from 700 students in 1976 to 240 in 2010–11 and 188 in the school's final year of operation.

==== Other private schools ====
Other private high schools in Jersey City include First Christian Pentecostal Academy and Stevens Cooperative School. Kenmare High School is operated through the York Street Project as part of an effort to reduce rates of poverty in households headed by women, through a program that offers small class sizes, individualized learning and development of life skills. The French American Academy, located in the century-old three-story building of the former St. Mary's High School, is a private bilingual school PK-3. A number of other private schools are also available. Genesis Educational Center is a private Christian school located in downtown Jersey City for ages newborn through 8th grade. The Jersey City Art School is a private art school located in downtown Jersey City for all ages. The Franklin School is a four year independent high school located in the Newport neighborhood.

== Transportation ==
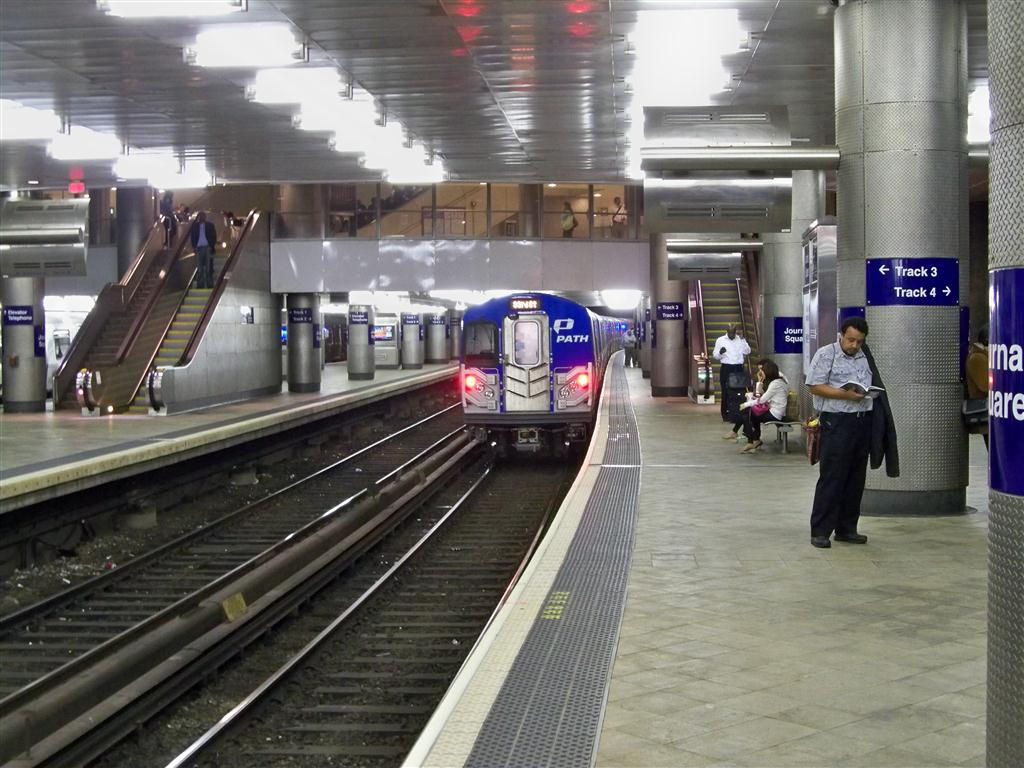
PATH train departing the Journal Square Transportation Center

Of all Jersey City commuters, 8.17% walk to work, and 46.62% take public transit. This is the second highest percentage of public transit riders of any city with a population of 100,000+ in the United States, behind only New York City and ahead of Washington, D.C.

=== Air ===
- Newport Helistop Heliport, on the Sixth Street Pier at the Hudson River in Newport
- Newark Liberty International Airport is the nearest commercial airport that serves Jersey City and is owned and operated by the Port Authority of New York and New Jersey.

=== Mass transit ===
==== Rail ====
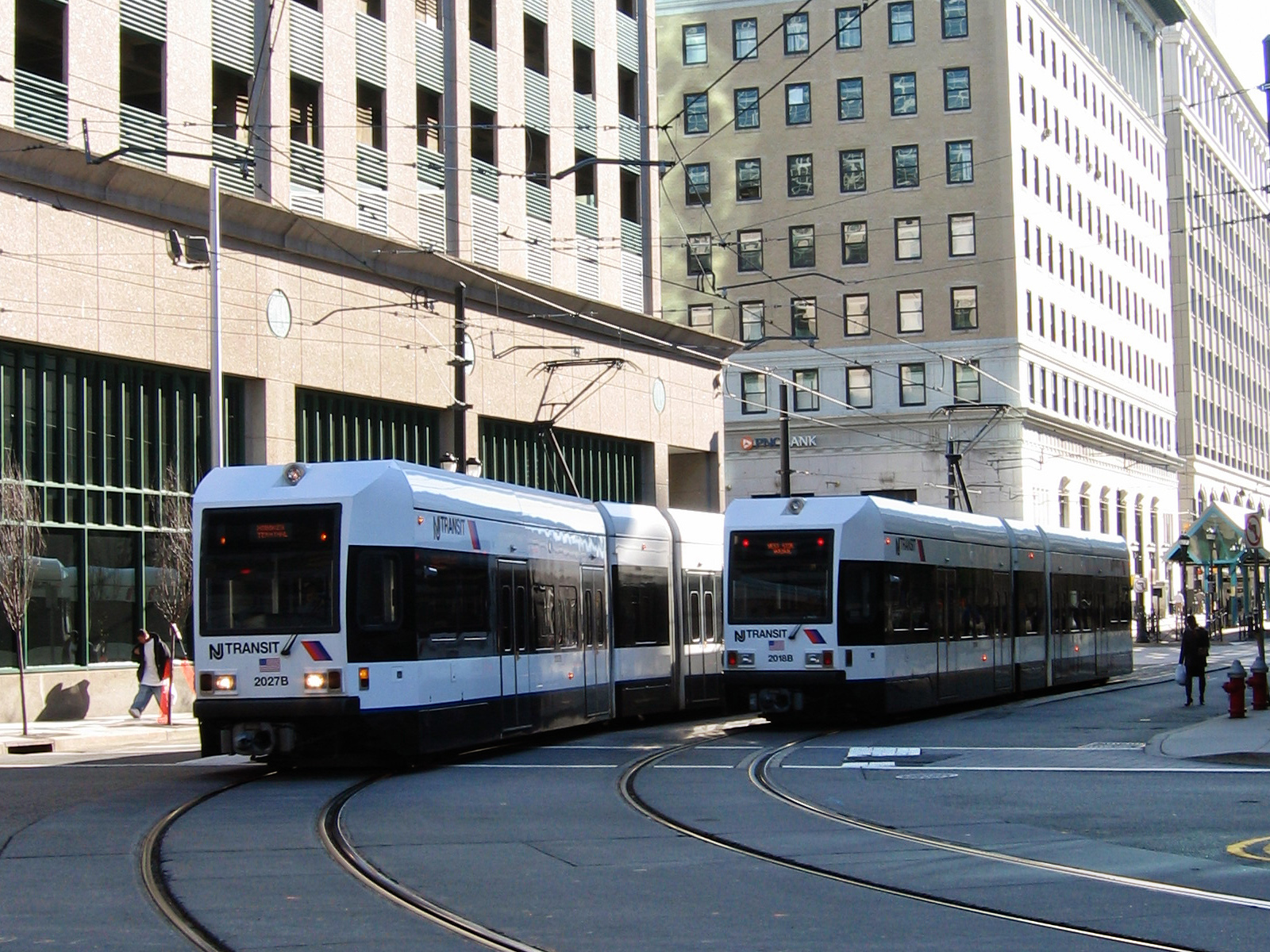
Hudson–Bergen Light Rail at Exchange Place

- Hudson-Bergen Light Rail: One of the most popular forms of transportation in the city. Of the 24 HBLR stations that connect its three terminus points, 13 are located in Jersey City.
- PATH: 24-hour rapid transit system with four stations in Jersey City: Exchange Place, Newport, Grove Street, and Journal Square. Service goes to Hoboken Terminal in Hoboken, 33rd Street station in Midtown Manhattan, World Trade Center in Lower Manhattan, and Newark Penn Station in Newark where inter-state Amtrak connections can be made.
- Hoboken Terminal, straddling the city's northeast corner: Main Line (to Suffern, and in partnership with MTA/Metro-North, express service to Port Jervis), Bergen County Line, and Pascack Valley Line, all via Secaucus Junction (where transfer is possible to Northeast Corridor Line); Montclair-Boonton Line and Morris and Essex Lines (both via Newark Broad Street Station); North Jersey Coast Line (limited service as Waterfront Connection via Newark Penn Station to Long Branch and Bay Head).

==== Bus ====
The Journal Square Transportation Center, Exchange Place and Hoboken Terminal are major origination/destination points for buses. Service is available to numerous points in Jersey City, Hudson County, and some suburban areas as well as to Newark on the 1, 2, 6, 8, 9, 10, 14, 16, 22, 23, 64, 68, 80, 81, 82, 83, 84, 85, 86, 87, 88, 89 bus routes. Service is available to the Port Authority Bus Terminal in Midtown Manhattan on the 119, 123, 125, 126 bus routes via the Lincoln Tunnel. Express service to Atlantic City is available on the 319 bus route.

In July 2023, the independent A&C Bus Corporation announced that it would discontinue operations after 96 years. In October 2023, the four routes that had been operated by A&C with a fleet of buses leased from NJ Transit, the 30, 31, 32 and 33, were taken over by NJ Transit bus operations under a modified route 80 and new routes 9, 14 and 8.

Increased use of jitneys, locally known as dollar vans, has greatly affected travel patterns in Hudson County, leading to decreased bus ridership on traditional bus lines.

Since 2016, two Taiwanese airlines, China Airlines and EVA Air, have provided private bus services to and from John F. Kennedy International Airport in New York City for customers based in New Jersey. These bus services stop in Jersey City.

==== Bus rapid transit ====
In 2012, the Board of County Commissioners identified possible bus rapid transit corridors following studies of existing systems and changes in public transportation usage patterns. It was determined that a Journal Square-Bayonne bus rapid transit system should be investigated. In 2025, Hudson County Executive, Craig Guy, announced that the county planning department will create conceptual designs of how Kennedy Boulevard could function with a BRT corridor.

In 2025, NJ Transit announced as part of the planned BRT Transitway from Secaucus Junction to the Meadowlands Sports Complex, the allocation of $22 million to complete design and engineering work for Phase 2 from Secaucus to Jersey City via the Bergen Arches.

==== Via on-demand public transit ====
In February 2020, the city launched its on-demand transit system in partnership with Via Transportation. The city-run microtransit service, Via Jersey City, complements and extends the existing public transit networks, providing better connections between residential neighborhoods, business districts, government facilities, PATH stations, and ferry and light rail stops in the north and south regions of the city. Commuters can use the Via app to book an on-demand ride from their smartphone. In March 2021, Via Jersey City was expanded to provide weekend service on Saturdays.

In July 2026, Saturday service was cut and operations were scaled back to run between 6:30 a.m. and 7 p.m Monday through Friday to help address the citys' budget deficit.

==== Water ====
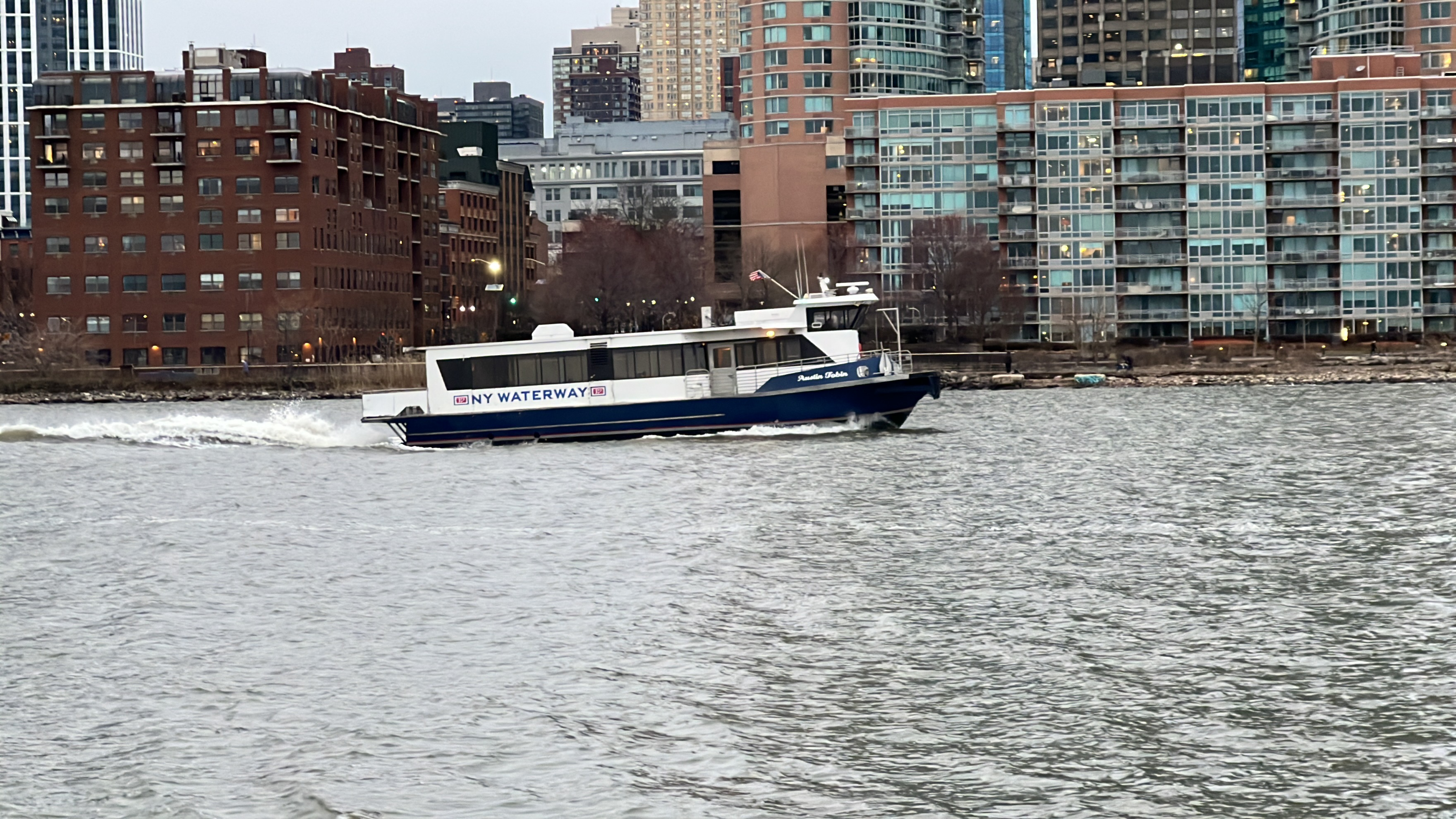
Ferry crossing the Morris Canal Basin in Jersey City

- NY Waterway ferries operate between Paulus Hook Ferry Terminal, Liberty Harbor and Port Liberté, Jersey City to Manhattan at Battery Park City Ferry Terminal, Pier 11/Wall Street, and West Midtown Ferry Terminal, where free transfer is available to a variety of "loop" buses.
- Liberty Landing Ferry operates ferries between Liberty Landing Marina, Warren Street and the Battery Park City Ferry Terminal at Brookfield Place (New York City).
- Statue City Cruises provides ferry service to and between Ellis Island and Liberty Island from Liberty State Park

=== Road ===
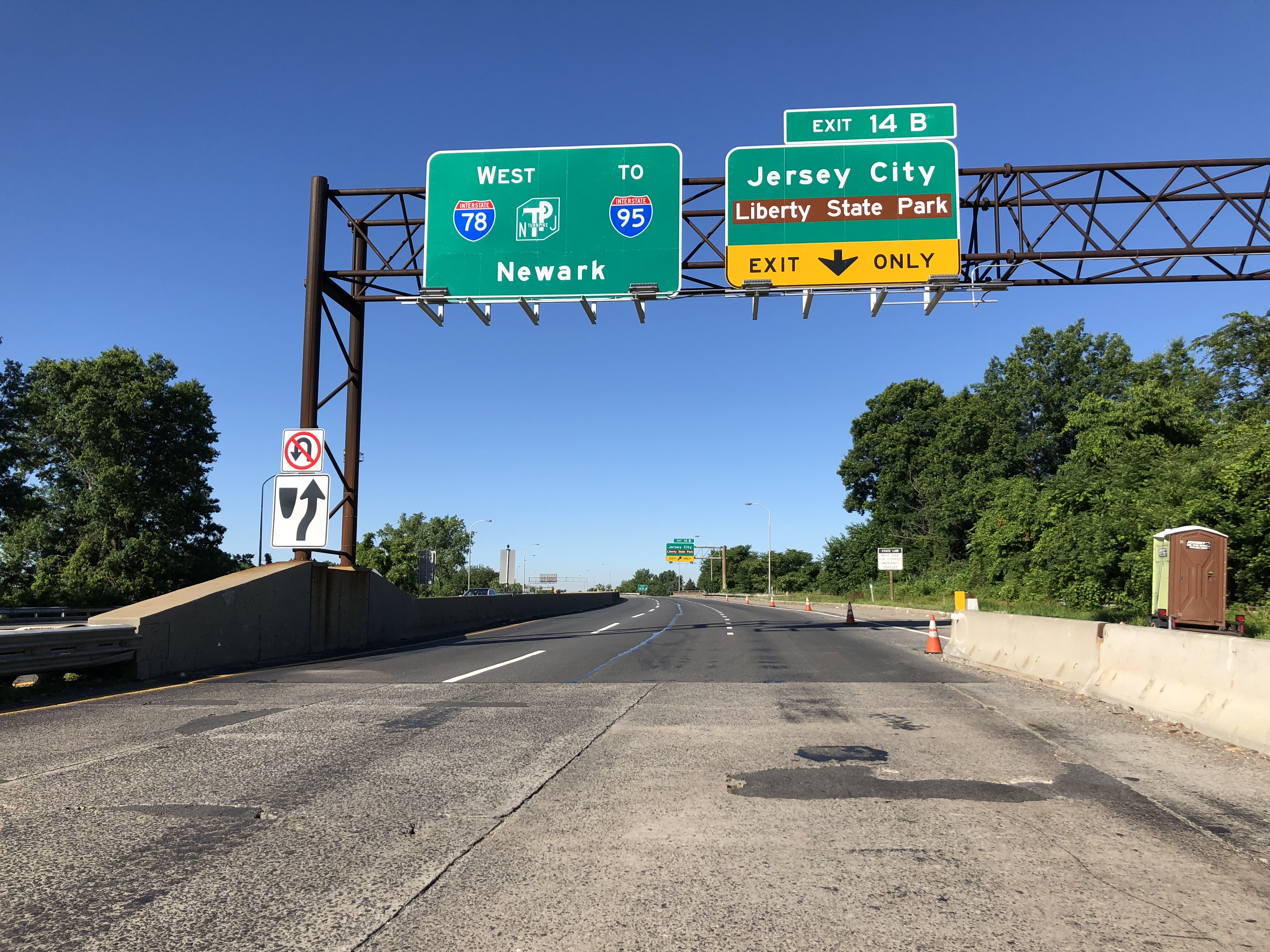
Interstate 78, the New Jersey Turnpike Newark Bay Extension, westbound at Exit 14B in Jersey City

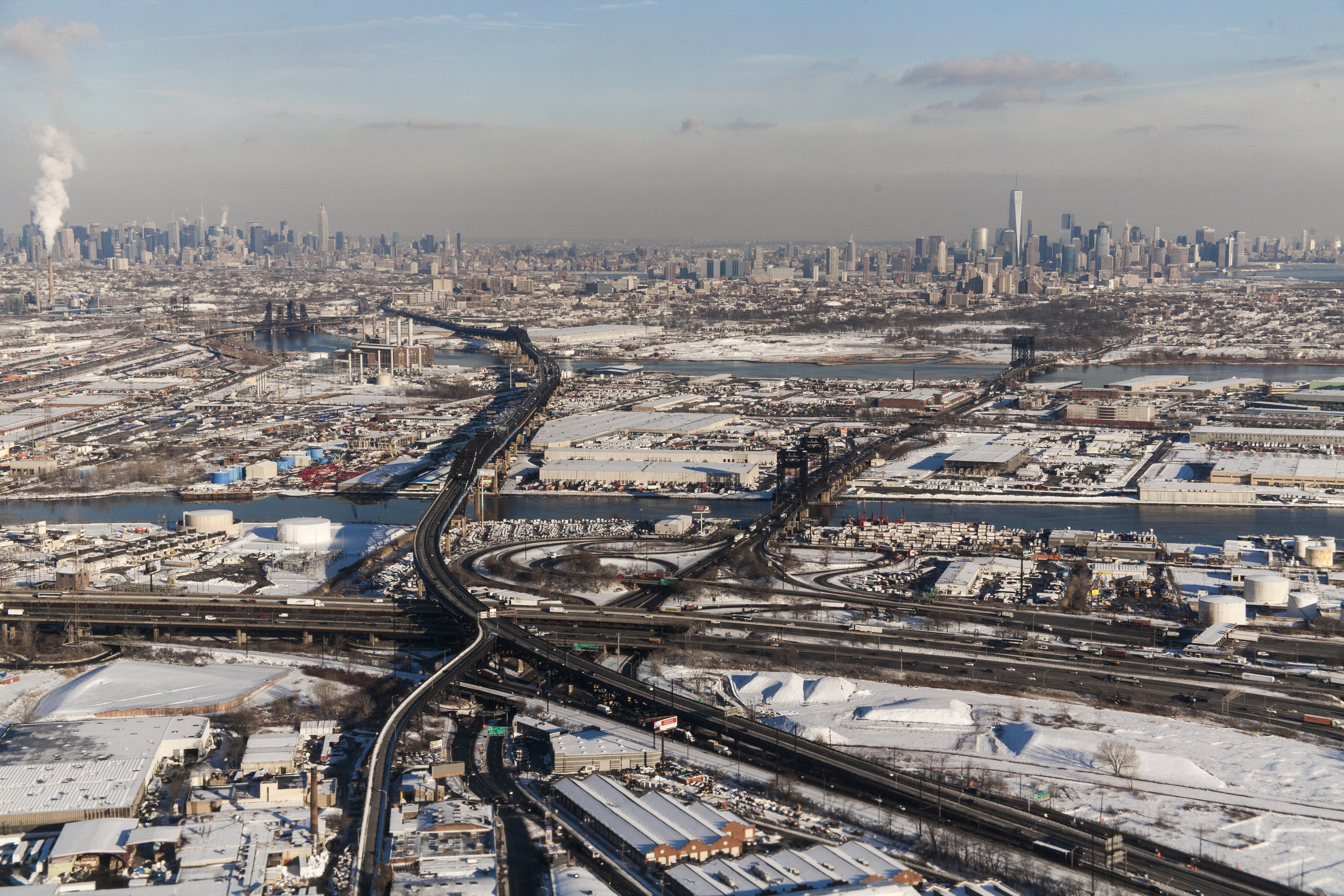
Looking east towards Jersey City, the Wittpenn Bridge (left), Pulaski Skyway (center) and Lincoln Highway Bridges (right)

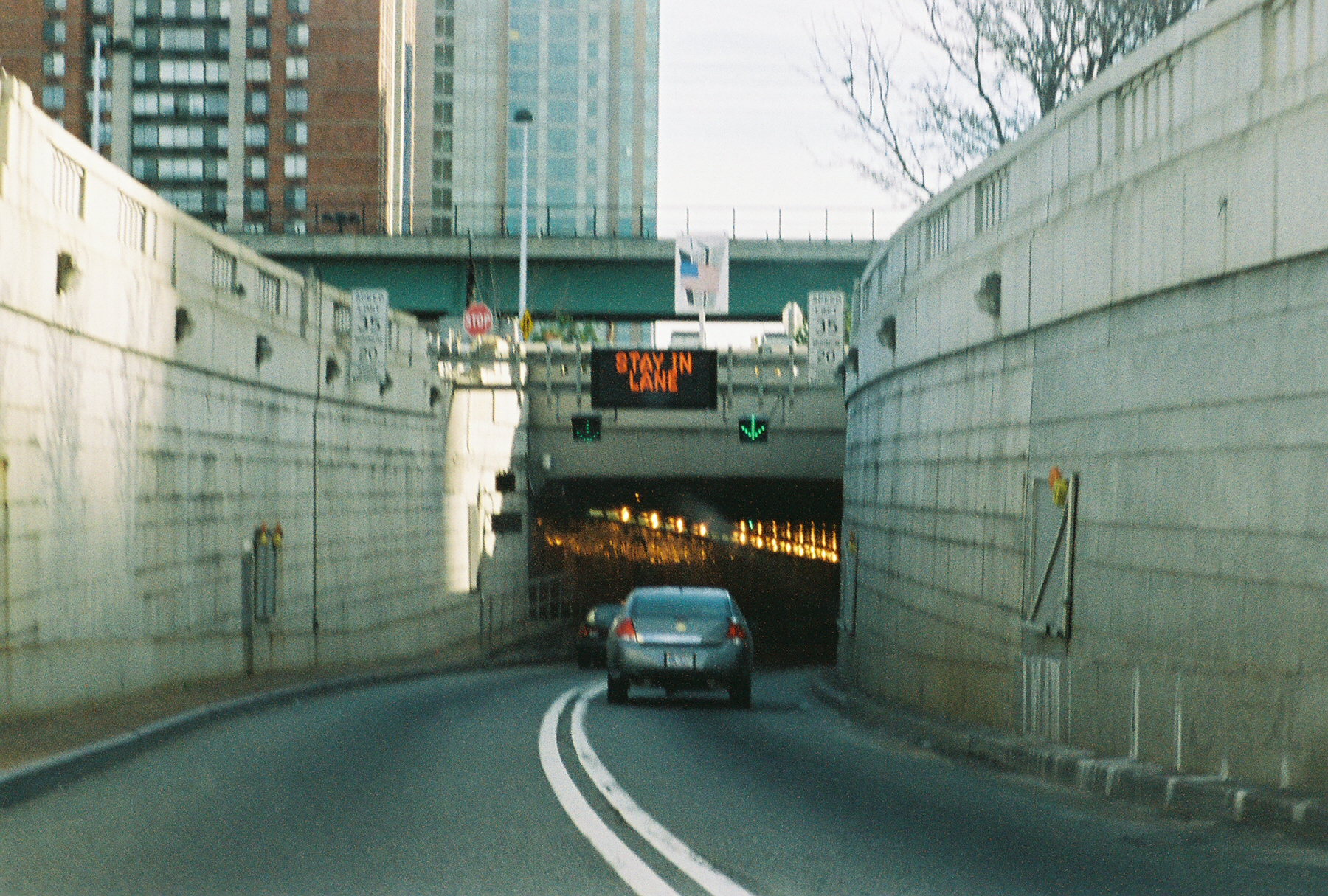
Entrance to the Holland Tunnel, which carries high amounts of vehicular traffic from New Jersey to Lower Manhattan

As of May 2010, the city had a total of 218.57 miles (351.75 km) of roadways, of which 189.88 miles (305.58 km) were maintained by the municipality, 10.34 miles (16.64 km) by Hudson County and 12.23 miles (19.68 km) by the New Jersey Department of Transportation, 1.09 miles (1.75 km) by the Port Authority of New York and New Jersey and 5.03 miles (8.10 km) by the New Jersey Turnpike Authority.

- Holland Tunnel: From Boyle Plaza in Downtown Jersey City to its eastern terminus at Canal Street in Manhattan (carries I-78 and Route 139).
- Highways include the New Jersey Turnpike Newark Bay Extension (I-78); the Pulaski Skyway (US 1/9), Route 7, Route 139, Route 185 and Route 440.
- Bridges include the Lincoln Highway Hackensack River Bridge from South Kearny to the West Side of Jersey City (carries Truck US 1/9) and the Wittpenn Bridge from Kearny to Jersey City (carries Route 7).

=== Bike ===
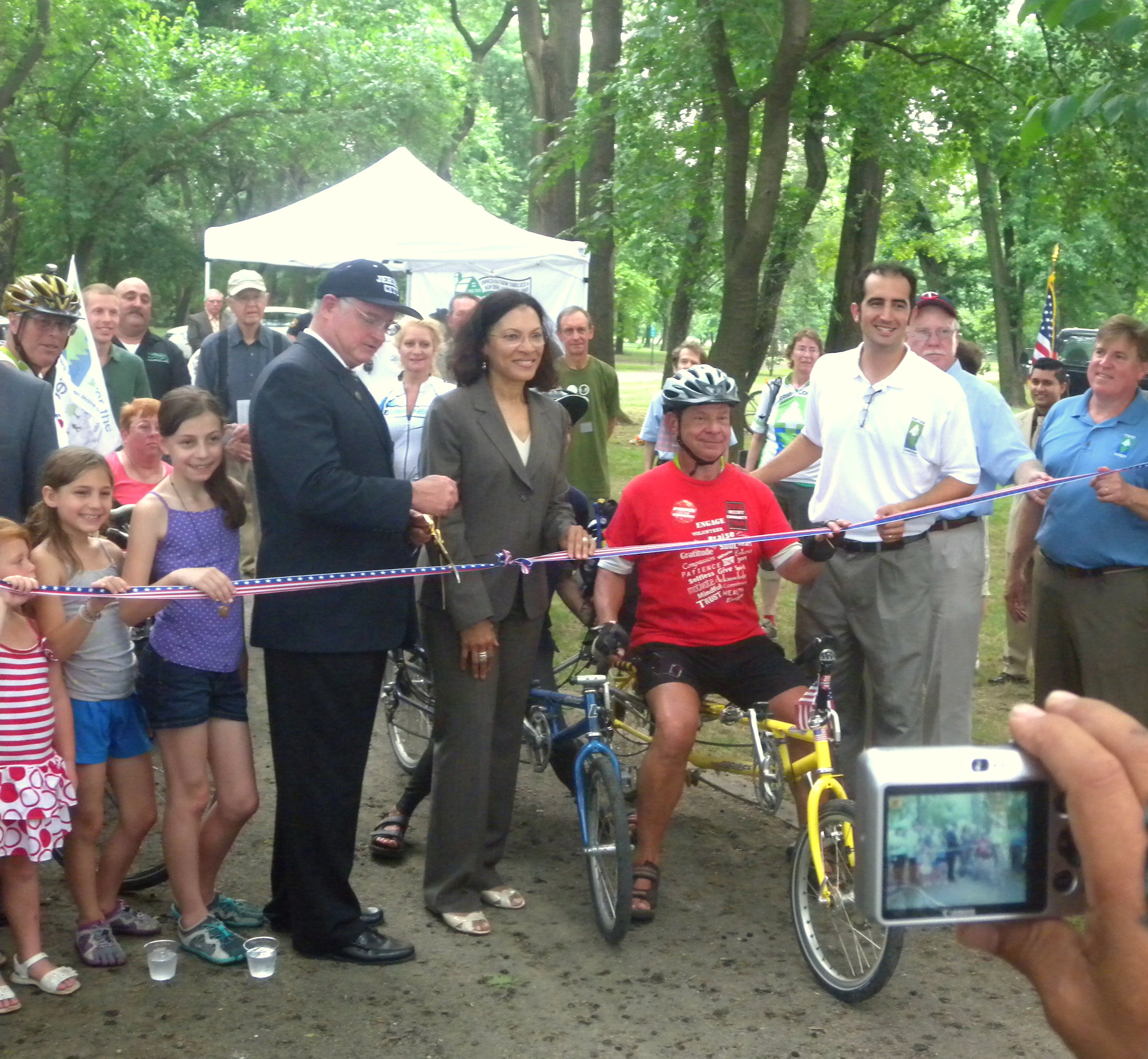
East Coast Greenway dedication ceremony

A part of the East Coast Greenway, a planned unbroken bike route from Maine to the Florida Keys, will travel through the city. In June 2012, part of the route was officially designated in Lincoln Park and over the Lincoln Highway Hackensack River Bridge. Both the Hudson River Waterfront Walkway and Hackensack River Greenway are bicycle friendly.

In April 2012, the city initiated the Morris Canal Greenway Plan to investigate the establishment of a greenway, including a bicycle path, that would follow the route of the Morris Canal to the greatest extent possible.

Also in April 2012, the city established bikes lanes along the length Grove Street, originally meant to temporary. In December 2012, the city announced that Grove Street lanes would become permanent and that it would add an additional 54 miles (87 km) of both dedicated and shared bike lanes. In 2019, the Grove Street lanes became the city's first protected bike lanes along with an additional 9 miles (14 km) of new protected bike lanes throughout the city. As of 2025, 27 miles (43 km) of protected bike lanes have been installed.

The Harbor Ring is an initiative to create a 50-mile bike route along the Lower Hudson River, Upper New York Bay, and Kill van Kull that would incorporate bike paths in the city.

In 2013, the city simplified the application and reduced the cost for business and residences to install bike racks as well as making them obligatory for certain new construction projects.

==== Bike share and storage ====
Also in 2013, Hudson County had initiated exploration of a bike-share program. Jersey City, Hoboken and Weehawken intended to operate the program starting in 2014 but delayed the launch due to lack of sponsorship. The revamped program officially launched on September 21, 2015, as Citi Bike with membership working in Jersey City and New York City. On May 3, 2021, Citi Bike eventually expanded to neighboring Hoboken with 15 stations and about 200 bikes. In June 2025, the Jersey City announced the addition of 25 new Citi Bike stations to the system in the Bergen-Lafayette, Greenville, West Side and Jackson Hill neighborhoods expanding the system from 53 to 78 stations. These new stations enable better connections to NY Waterway service at Port Liberté.

In 2024, the city officially launched the first municipal secure bike parking & charging network in the United States. Jersey City partnered with Oonee, a Brooklyn based bicycle storage company, to develop a network of 30 storage pods, racks and charging stations throughout the city. As of 2025, there are 7 locations at Journal Square (pilot location), McGinley Square, Newport, Exchange Place, Washington and Montgomery Streets, the Grove Street PATH station and the Danforth Avenue HBLR station. In 2025, the battery charging and swapping program for e-bikes and e-scooters was initiated at two locations, McGinley Square and Washington and Montgomery Streets.

=== Pedestrian safety ===
In 2018, Jersey City adopted the Vision Zero initiative becoming the first city in New Jersey to do so. The city implemented a number of traffic calming measures to make certain intersections and streets safer. These include giving pedestrians lead time before turning traffic lights green, enhancing crosswalks, installing bump-outs, curb extensions, and vertical delineators by daylighting intersections to improve sightlines for motorists to avoid collisions with cyclists, pedestrians, and other cars. Additionally, speed bumps were installed on various corridors and designated vehicle restricted "slow streets" were created. Street space reclamation projects through "tactical urbanism" created new pedestrian plazas throughout the city. As a result of these efforts, in 2022 Jersey City did not experience a traffic death on streets owned and maintained by the city for a single year.

These measures along with the city's compactness, density, transit and bike infrastructure has led Jersey City to become known as one of the most walkable cities in the world. As of 2025, Walk Score ranks Jersey City as the third most walkable U.S. city, with a Walk Score of 87, a Transit Score of 70, and a Bike Score of 64.

=== Modal characteristics ===
Jersey City has a high percentage of residents who commute without a car. In 2000, 40.67% of Jersey City households did not own an automobile, the second-highest of all cities in the United States with 50,000 to 250,000 residents. In 2015, that dropped to 40.1% of Jersey City households were without a car, which decreased further to 37.1% in 2016. The national average was 8.7% in 2016. Jersey City averaged 0.85 cars per household in 2016, compared to a national average of 1.8 per household. In 2020, 37.1% of Jersey City households were still without a car giving the city an average of 0.85 cars per household, the fourth fewest in the nation. The national average for households without a car was 8.3% in 2025.

== Hospitals and healthcare ==
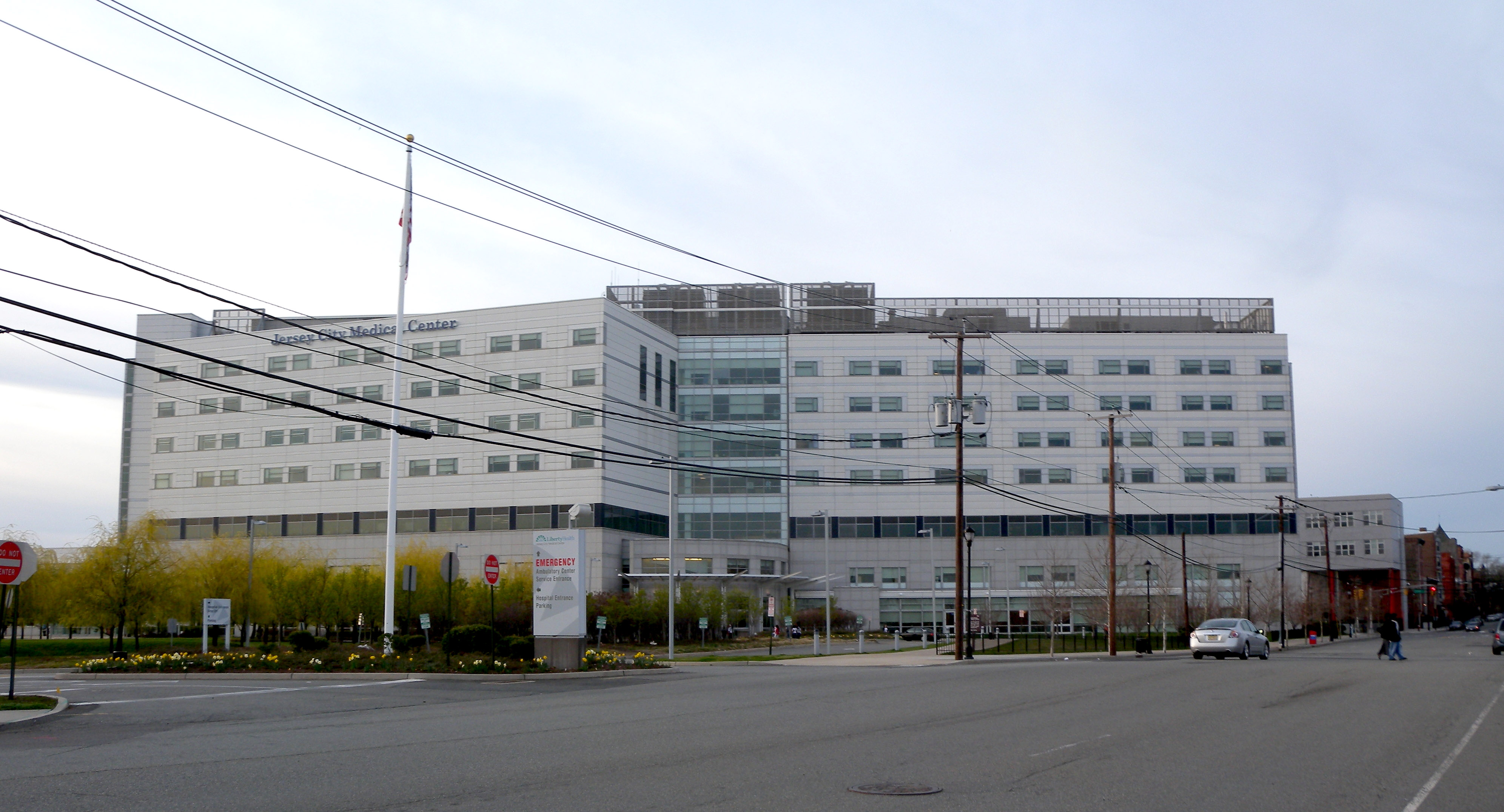
Jersey City Medical Center

As of 2026, Jersey City is home to one hospital. Jersey City Medical Center (JCMC) is a 352-bed, Level II Regional Trauma Center and teaching hospital that is located on a 15-acre campus in Downtown Jersey City that includes Wilzig Hospital, the Provident Bank Ambulatory Center, the Cristie Kerr Women's Health Center and the Abercrombie Guild Pediatric Emergency Department (ED), the only pediatric ED in Hudson County. It is part of RWJBarnabas Health, New Jersey's largest network of independent hospitals and healthcare facilities. The medical center is Jersey City's largest medical center and oldest hospital dating back to 1868 and was the first medical center in New Jersey and one of the first in the United States. By the 1940s, it had grown to become the third-largest healthcare center in the world. From 1956 to 1968, the medical center was the original home of the Seton Hall College of Medicine and Dentistry, the predecessor to the University of Medicine and Dentistry of New Jersey (UMDNJ) in Newark.

Jersey City Medical Center at Greenville is an outpatient medical center and urgent care operated by JCMC in the Greenville section of Jersey City that opened in 2015 in the former Greenville Hospital. Originally opened in 1898 as the "German Hospital and Dispensary of Hudson County" and Jersey City's third hospital, the facility grew over the years with the current building opening in 1964 and a west wing added in 1971. Greenville Hospital closed in 2008 due to cuts in the state budget and was later used as the home of Jersey City Medical Center's EMS from 2009 to 2011.

Englewood Health ZT Systems Outpatient Center is an outpatient medical center and urgent care operated by Englewood Hospital and Medical Center in Journal Square that opened in 2022. The facility occupies over 73,000 square feet (6,800 m^{2}) across three-floors at 2 Journal Square.

Heights University Hospital (formerly Christ Hospital) was a 376-bed, private for-profit hospital in the Jersey City Heights. Established in 1872, the hospital was originally affiliated with the Episcopal Diocese of Newark and was the second oldest and second largest hospital in Jersey City. The hospital was part of the CarePoint Health system, which filed for Chapter 11 bankruptcy protection in November 2024. In 2025, Hudson Regional Health (HRH) took over the hospital and announced the hospital would close if more state funding could not be secured. Unable to secure funding, HRH decided to close the hospital in November 2025, except for the emergency room, which later closed on March 14, 2026. Since 1890, the hospital had been home to the Christ Hospital School of Nursing which merged with the Bayonne Medical Center nursing school 2014.

Saint Francis Hospital was founded in 1864 by the Society of the Sisters of St. Francis and constructed the first hospital building in 1870 across from Hamilton Park in Downtown Jersey City. In 2005, the hospital closed and was sold by the Bon Secours Health System and converted into a residential complex.

== Sister cities ==
Sister cities of Jersey City are:

- Cusco, Peru (1988)
- Karpathos, Greece (1992)
- Changwon, South Korea (1993)
- New Delhi, India (1993)
- Ahmedabad, India (1994)
- Nantong, China (1994)
- Changsha, China (1995)
- Ozamiz, Philippines (1995)
- Jerusalem, Israel (1997)
- Oviedo, Spain (1998)
- Sant'Arsenio, Italy (1999)
- Kolkata (Calcutta), India (2001)
- Saint John's, Antigua and Barbuda (2002)
- Palatka, Florida, United States (2016)
- Gomoa West District, Ghana (2018)
- Indrawati, Nepal (2018)
- General Santos, Philippines (2018)
- Beit Shemesh, Israel (2022)

== See also ==
- Bergen Township, New Jersey (1661–1862)
- Demographics of New Jersey
- Gold Coast, New Jersey
- Northeast Megalopolis
- Timeline of Jersey City area railroads
- Transportation in New Jersey
- Van Vorst Township, New Jersey
