= List of people from Jersey City, New Jersey =

The following is a list of notable people from Jersey City, in the U.S. state of New Jersey. (B) denotes that the person was born there.

== Academics and scientists ==
- Jean Anyon (1941–2013), education researcher who wrote Ghetto Schooling (B)
- Charles Cicchetti (born 1943), economist
- Neilson Debevoise (1903–1992), historian of the Parthian Empire (B)
- Eby Friedman (born 1957), engineering researcher who specializes in high performance integrated circuit design of semiconductor chips (B)
- Michael M. Gottesman (born 1946), biochemist and physician-scientist (B)
- William Harkness (1837–1903), astronomer
- Donald Landry, scientist, chair of the Department of Medicine at Columbia University, physician-in-chief at NewYork-Presbyterian Hospital/Columbia University Irving Medical Center
- Robert J. Morris (1914–1996), anti-communist activist, president of the University of Dallas, served as chief counsel to the United States Senate Subcommittee on Internal Security
- Joseph Russoniello (1944–2022), two-term U.S. attorney for the Northern District of California and former dean of San Francisco Law School
- Beverly Whipple (1941–2026), sexologist, author and academic, who co-authored The G Spot and Other Recent Discoveries About Human Sexuality (B)

== Arts ==
=== Fine arts ===
- John Bachmann (1814–1896), lithographer who pioneered "bird's-eye view" prints, especially of New York City
- George Catlin (1796–1872), painter, author and traveler who specialized in portraits of Native Americans in the Old West
- Elaine Lustig Cohen (1927–2016), graphic designer, artist and archivist (B)
- Alphaeus Philemon Cole (1876–1988), artist, engraver and etcher; son of engraver Timothy Cole; died at age 112 (B)
- Bernice Pauahi Fernow (1881–1969), miniature painter whose work is part of the permanent collection at the Metropolitan Museum of Art
- Archimedes Giacomantonio (1906–1988), sculptor known for his busts of noted figures
- Grigory Gurevich (born 1938), painter, sculptor, graphic artist, photographer, illustrator, bookmaker, mime and inventor
- Brian Hanlon, sculptor (B)
- Carroll N. Jones III (1944–2017), artist in the style of American realism
- Kaws (born 1974 as Brian Donnelly), graffiti artist, limited-edition clothing and toy designer
- Richard Lahey (1893–1978), artist who competed in the painting event as part of the art competition at the 1932 Summer Olympics (B)
- Alexander Melamid (born 1945), Russian painter
- Herbert Migdoll (1934–2025), painter, environmental installation artist and photographer, company photographer for The Joffrey Ballet since 1968, and later as its design director (B)
- Chi Modu (1966–2021), photographer known for his photos of various pioneering hip-hop music entertainers
- Henriette Simon Picker (1917–2016), painter and fashion designer (B)
- Arthur Secunda (1927–2022), painter, sculptor and printmaker (B)

=== Movies, stage, television and modeling ===
- Nick Adams (1931–1968), actor who appeared in Hollywood films and on television during the 1950s and 1960s
- Elizabeth Allen (1929–2006), stage and screen actress (B)
- Beetlejuice (born 1968), entertainer and Howard Stern Show personality (B)
- Philip Bosco (1930–2018), stage and screen actor who was nominated for a Tony Award in 1996 for Best Actor in Moon Over Buffalo (B)
- Lisa Brown (1954–2021), stage and screen actress known for her roles on Guiding Light and As The World Turns
- John Calley (1930–2011), movie producer who was nominated for an Oscar for Best Picture in 1993 for The Remains of the Day (B)
- Richard Conte (1910–1975), actor who appeared in The Godfather as Don Barzini (B)
- Danny Dayton (1923–1999), character actor (B)
- Kyan Douglas (born 1970 as Hugh Edward Douglas Jr.), grooming expert, Queer Eye for the Straight Guy
- Al Eschbach, radio personality
- Cirie Fields (born 1970), six-time Survivor contestant who appeared on Survivor: Panama (finishing in 4th place), Survivor: Micronesia (3rd), Survivor: Heroes vs. Villains (17th), Survivor: Game Changers (6th), Survivor: Australia V The World (4th), and Survivor 50: In the Hands of the Fans (6th)
- Ruth Findlay (1896–1949), Broadway actress
- Susan Flannery (born 1943), television and screen actress (B)
- Leon Gast (1936–2021), film director, producer, cinematographer and editor best known for his documentary When We Were Kings (B)
- Jason Genao (born 1996), actor best known for his appearance in the Netflix show On My Block (B)
- Paul Gleason (1939–2006), film and television actor who appeared in Trading Places, The Breakfast Club and Die Hard (B)
- Paul Guilfoyle (1902–1961), character actor; plays a man who tries to kill James Cagney in White Heat (B)
- Kim Haas, journalist; producer and host of the PBS series Afro-Latino Travels with Kim Haas
- Dennis James (1917–1997), game show host, most notably The Price Is Right, 1972–1977 in syndication
- Herbert Jefferson Jr. (born 1946), film, television and stage actor, appeared in Battlestar Galactica and Rich Man, Poor Man
- Victor Kilian (1891–1979), character actor of the 1930s and 1940s, who later played the libidinous grandfather on Mary Hartman, Mary Hartman (B)
- June Kirby (1928–2022), actress and model
- Nathan Lane (born 1956), Broadway and film actor (B)
- Norman Lloyd (1914–2021), actor, producer and director who appeared in Alfred Hitchcock's Saboteur in 1942 and Dead Poets Society in 1989 (B) (B)
- Derek Luke (born 1974), actor, won the Independent Spirit Award for his performance in Antwone Fisher (B)
- Denise Mercedes (born 1991), plus-size fashion model and clothing designer (B)
- Kate Micucci (born 1980), actress, voice actress, comedian, singer-songwriter and artist (B)
- Diane Neal (born 1976), actress who has appeared on Law and Order: SVU
- Ozzie Nelson (1906–1975), bandleader, actor and TV personality, The Adventures of Ozzie and Harriet (B)
- Phyllis Newman (1933–2019), actress and singer (B)
- Patrice O'Neal (1969–2011), stand-up comedian, radio personality and actor
- Cliff Osmond (1937–2012), character actor and television screenwriter best known for appearing in films directed by Billy Wilder (B)
- Sal Piro (1950–2023), actor; president of The Rocky Horror Picture Show Fan Club from 1977 until his death (B)
- Kevin Powell (born 1966), journalist, poet, cast member on first season of MTV reality show The Real World
- Billy Quirk (1873–1926), silent movie actor who appeared in 180 films (B)
- Bryna Raeburn (1915–1985), radio and voice actress
- Michelle Rodriguez (born 1978), actress, screenwriter and disc jockey
- Basil Ruysdael (1878–1960), character actor on stage, films and radio and was a star bass-baritone with the Metropolitan Opera Company (B)
- Joseph Sargent (1925–2014), actor, producer and television director who won four Emmy Awards (B)
- Kate Lyn Sheil (born 1985), actress, House of Cards
- Mary Percy Schenck (1917–2005), Tony Award winning costume designer
- William N. Stape (born 1968), screenwriter and magazine writer who wrote episodes of Star Trek: The Next Generation and Star Trek: Deep Space Nine (B)
- Martha Stewart (born 1941), media personality, author and magazine publisher (B)
- Michael E. Uslan (born 1951), originator and executive producer of the Batman/Dark Knight/Joker movie franchise (B)
- Tony Vlachos (born 1973), winner of the reality TV series Survivor: Cagayan and Survivor: Winners at War
- Tracey Walter (born 1947), character actor who has appeared in over 100 films and television shows (B)
- Malcolm-Jamal Warner (1970–2025), actor, The Cosby Show (B)
- Larry Wilde (1928–2023), actor, comedian, motivational speaker, university instructor and publisher (B)
- Flip Wilson (1933–1998), comedian, actor, The Flip Wilson Show (B)

=== Music ===
- Akon (born 1973), rapper and R&B singer
- Paul Banks (born 1978), lead singer, lyricist and guitarist of the New York City-based band Interpol
- Robert "Kool" Bell (born 1950), musician and founder of Kool & the Gang
- Brute Force (stage name of Stephen Friedland, born 1940), singer and songwriter (B)
- Joe Budden (born 1980), rapper and member of hip hop group Slaughterhouse
- Anthony J. Cirone (born 1941), percussionist with the San Francisco Symphony under Maestro Josef Krips (B)
- Attrell Cordes (1970–2016), musician, rapper, producer, co-founder and lead vocalist of P.M. Dawn
- Dino Danelli (born 1944), drummer for the 1960s rock group The Rascals (B)
- Leonard De Paur (1914–1998), composer, choral director and arts administrator
- Al Di Meola (born 1954), jazz fusion guitarist (B)
- Maude Roberts George (1888–1943), singer, arts administrator and music critic, president of the National Association of Negro Musicians 1933–1935
- John P. Hammond (1942–2026), blues singer and guitarist
- Andrew Hill (1931–2007), jazz pianist and composer
- Hao Huang (born 1957), pianist and music professor (B)
- Kid Buu (born 1988), rapper (B)
- Dave Kikoski (born 1961), jazz pianist and keyboardist
- Marilyn McCoo (born 1943), singer and one of the five members of The 5th Dimension (B)
- Gil Mellé (1931–2004), recording artist, songwriter, jazz musician and composer whose score for The Andromeda Strain was the first all-electronic film score (B)
- Christina Milian (born 1981), actress and recording artist (B)
- Frank Sinatra (1915–1998), singer and actor who resided in Jersey City after his marriage to Nancy Barbato
- Frank Sinatra Jr. (1944–2016), singer and conductor (B)
- Nancy Sinatra (born 1940), singer and actress (B)
- Claydes Charles Smith (1946–2006), co-founder and lead guitarist of Kool & the Gang (B)
- Dennis "Dee Tee" Thomas (1951–2021), alto saxophone player, flautist, and percussionist, founding member of R&B/soul/funk Kool & the Gang
- Florence Turner-Maley (1871–1926), composer and singer
- Maury Yeston (born 1945), composer, lyricist, educator and musicologist

== Business and industry ==
- Adrien Arpel (born 1941), cosmetics and skincare entrepreneur (B)
- Andrew Bellucci (1964–2023), cook, a figure in New York City's pizza scene in the 1990s (B)
- Myril Axelrod Bennett (1920–2014), an early female executive in the advertising industry
- George Louis Bettcher (1862–1952), architect based in Denver, Colorado (B)
- Curtis Blake (1917–2019), businessman, co-founder of the Friendly Ice Cream Corporation (B)
- William DeNoble (1924–2007), labor organizer (B)
- Angelou Ezeilo (born 1965), social entrepreneur and environmental activist
- Frederick Godley (1886–1961), architect and Yale educator who worked in the Neo-Gothic and Art Deco styles (B)
- Patricia Morgan (1939–1986?), businesswoman, former sex worker, one of the earliest people to undergo gender reassignment surgery in the U.S. (B)
- Irving Naxon (1902–1989), engineer and inventor, best known for patenting the slow cooker (B)
- Bill Perkins (born 1969), hedge fund manager
- Edwards Ogden Schuyler (1865–1905), stock trader and member of the New York Stock Exchange

== Law ==
- Raymond A. Brown (1915–2009), attorney whose clients included Black Liberation Army member Assata Shakur, boxer Rubin "Hurricane" Carter and "Dr. X" physician Mario Jascalevich
- Louis Freeh (born 1950), FBI director, 1993–2001 (B)
- Marie L. Garibaldi (1934–2016), lawyer, associate justice of the New Jersey Supreme Court (B)
- Job H. Lippincott (1842–1900), U.S. attorney for the District of New Jersey; associate justice of the New Jersey Supreme Court, 1893–1900
- Evelyn Padin (born 1960), attorney serving as a United States district judge of the United States District Court for the District of New Jersey (B)
- Mary Philbrook (1872–1958), champion of equal rights for women, first lawyer admitted to the New Jersey Bar (B)
- Joseph Russoniello (born 1941), two-term U.S. attorney for the Northern District of California and former dean of San Francisco Law School
- Alexander Simpson (1872–1953), served in both houses of the New Jersey Legislature and as assistant attorney general of New Jersey (B)
- Nadine Strossen (born 1950), president of the American Civil Liberties Union, 1991–2008 (B)
- Shirley Tolentino (1943–2010), first Black woman to serve on New Jersey Superior Court; first Black woman appointed to the Jersey City Municipal Court and to serve as its presiding judge (B)

== Literature and journalism ==
- Nick Acocella (1943–2020), political journalist and author (B)
- Hiag Akmakjian (1926–2017), author, painter and photographer (B)
- Jim Bishop (1907–1987), writer and journalist (B)
- Ella Barksdale Brown (1871–1966), journalist and educator
- Vincent Czyz (born 1963), writer and critic of speculative fiction
- Jerry DeFuccio (1925–2001), comic book writer and editor at Mad magazine
- Louise DeSalvo (1942–2018), writer, editor, professor, lecturer, renowned Virginia Woolf scholar (B)
- Thomas Fleming (1927–2017), military historian and historical novelist (B)
- Glen Ford (1949–2021), journalist, socialist, co-founder of the America's Black Forum and Black Agenda Report (B)
- J. Owen Grundy (1912–1985), journalist and Jersey City's official historian (B)
- Thomas Kiernan (1933–2003), writer known for biographies on individuals including Laurence Olivier, Jane Fonda, John Steinbeck and Yasser Arafat (B)
- Joseph Krumgold (1908–1980), screenwriter who won two Newbery Awards (B)
- Laura McCullough (born 1960), poet (B)
- Lillian Morrison (1917–2014), poet, author and librarian (B)
- Walter Dean Myers (1937–2014), author of young-adult literature, five-time winner of the Coretta Scott King Award
- Michael Shaara (1928–1988), author of the Civil War book, The Killer Angels (B)
- Philip Van Doren Stern (1900–1984), author, editor, and Civil War historian whose 1943 story "The Greatest Gift", inspired the classic Christmas film It's a Wonderful Life (1946)
- Matt Taibbi (born 1970), author and journalist
- Janine Pommy Vega (1942–2010), poet associated with the Beat Generation

== Military ==
- John F. Bentivegna (born 1976), 2nd chief master sergeant of the Space Force
- Francis X. Burke (1918–1988), recipient of the Medal of Honor during World War II
- Edward M. Daly (born 1965), four-star general in the United States Army who serves as the 20th commanding general of the U.S. Army Materiel Command
- Martin Dempsey (born 1952), U.S. Army general, 18th chairman of the Joint Chiefs of Staff (B)
- John G. Gertsch (1945–1969), posthumously awarded the Medal of Honor during the Vietnam War
- James Jonas Madison (1884–1922), awarded the Medal of Honor for service in World War I (B)
- John W. Meagher (1917–1996), recipient of the Medal of Honor during World War II
- Charles J. Watters (1927–1967), chaplain posthumously awarded the Medal of Honor during the Vietnam War (B)
- George D. Zamka (born 1962), NASA astronaut and Marine Corps pilot who piloted the Space Shuttle Discovery in its 2007 mission to the International Space Station and was commander of mission STS-130 in 2010 (B)

== Politics ==
- Gabriel M. Ambrosio (1938–2013), served in the New Jersey Senate, representing the 36th Legislative District (B)
- Francis Brill (1836–1913), served in the New York State Assembly 1877 (B)
- Robert Burns (1926–2016), served two terms in the New Jersey General Assembly from the 38th Legislative District (B)
- Charles J. Catrillo (1945–2004), served in the New Jersey General Assembly from the 32nd Legislative District 1986–1988 (B)
- Orestes Cleveland (1829–1896), mayor of Jersey City 1864–1867 and 1886–1892, U.S. representative from New Jersey's 5th congressional district, 1869–1871
- Leonard T. Connors (1929–2016), served in the New Jersey Senate, 1982–2008 representing the 9th Legislative District; mayor of Surf City, New Jersey, 1966–2015 (B)
- Glenn Cunningham (1943–2004), first African-American mayor of Jersey City (B)
- William Davis Daly (1851–1900), member of the U.S. House of Representatives 1899–1900 (B)
- Dominick V. Daniels (1908–1987), member of the U.S. House of Representatives 1959–1977 (B)
- Harriet E. Derman (born 1943), politician elected to two terms in the New Jersey General Assembly, served as head of the New Jersey Department of Community Affairs (B)
- Edward I. Edwards (1863–1931), politician, 37th governor of New Jersey; served in the United States Senate 1923–1929
- Bayard H. Faulkner (1894–1983), Mayor of Montclair, New Jersey, and chairman of the 1950 Commission on Municipal Government that created the Faulkner Act, named in his honor
- George Bragg Fielder (1842–1906), represented New Jersey's 7th congressional district in the United States House of Representatives 1893–1895; father of James Fairman Fielder (B)
- James Fairman Fielder (1867–1954), 35th governor of New Jersey 1914–1917 (B)
- William P. Fitzpatrick (1940–1975), politician, represented the 10th legislative district in the New Jersey General Assembly from 1974 until his death (B)
- David Friedland (1937–2022), former member of the New Jersey Senate, convicted of racketeering after faking his death
- Cornelius "Cornbread" Givens (1931–2008), civil rights leader who became the first African American to run for mayor of a major US city, when he ran for office in Jersey City
- Edward W. Gray (1870–1942), member of the U.S. House of Representatives, 1915–1919 (B)
- Frank J. Guarini (1924–2026), member of the U.S. House of Representatives, 1993–1999 (B)
- Frank Hague (1876–1956), long-time mayor of Jersey City (B)
- James A. Hamill (1877–1941), member of the U.S. House of Representatives, 1907–1921 (B)
- Edward J. Hart (1893–1961), member of the U.S. House of Representatives, 1935–1955 (B)
- George Helmy (born 1979), U.S. senator for New Jersey (B)
- Frank Herbert (1931–2018), politician who served in the New Jersey Senate and the Bergen County Board of Chosen Freeholders (B)
- Anthony Impreveduto (1948–2009), served in the New Jersey General Assembly 1988–2004, when he resigned following a guilty plea to corruption charges (B)
- John V. Kelly (1926–2009), served in the New Jersey General Assembly (B)
- Walter M. D. Kern (1937–1998), served in the New Jersey General Assembly, 1978–1990, where he represented the 40th Legislative District (B)
- William H. Lash (1961–2006), assistant secretary for Market Access and Compliance at the United States Department of Commerce 2001–2005 (B)
- Eugene W. Leake (1877–1959), member of the US House of Representatives, 1907–1909 (B)
- Mary Madison (born 1950), politician, minister and educator who represents the 31st district in the Iowa House of Representatives
- Arthur Manner (1912–1981), politician who served in the New Jersey General Assembly 1972–1974 (B)
- William A. Marra (1928–1998), anti-abortion activist, political candidate and professor
- John J. Matheussen (born 1953), served in the New Jersey Senate 1992–2003, where he represented the 4th Legislative District (B)
- William McAdoo (1853–1930), represented New Jersey's 7th congressional district, 1883–1891; served as New York City Police Commissioner in 1904 and 1905
- Jim McGreevey (born 1957), 52nd governor of New Jersey (B)
- Rob Menendez (born 1985), U.S. representative for New Jersey's 8th congressional district; son of former Senator Bob Menendez
- John Gerald Milton (1881–1977), represented New Jersey in the United States Senate in 1938 (B)
- A. Harry Moore (1877–1952), 39th governor of New Jersey, was elected to three separate non-consecutive terms and also served in the U.S. Senate (B)
- Mike Mrowicki, served in the Vermont House of Representatives since 2009
- Franklin Murphy (1846–1920), 31st governor of New Jersey, 1902–1905 (B)
- William Musto (1917–2006), mayor of Union City, New Jersey, 1962–1970 and 1974–1982 (B)
- Mary Teresa Norton (1875–1959), first woman Democrat elected to the U.S. House of Representatives, served 1925–1951 (B)
- Charles F. X. O'Brien (1879–1940), member of the U.S. House of Representatives, 1921–1925 (B)
- Kathleen Passidomo (born 1953), member of the Florida Legislature (B)
- Bill Perkins (1941–2016), running back in the American Football League for the New York Jets who later served two terms in the New Jersey General Assembly (B)
- Phelps Phelps (1894–1981), 38th governor of American Samoa and U.S. ambassador to the Dominican Republic
- Louis Romano (1930–2020), represented the 33rd Legislative District in the New Jersey General Assembly 1992–2000 (B)
- Alfred Dennis Sieminski (1911–1990), served in the U.S. House of Representatives 1951–1959 (B)
- Alexander Simpson (1872–1953), served in both houses of the New Jersey Legislature and as Assistant Attorney General of New Jersey (B)
- Thomas F. X. Smith (1928–1996), professional basketball player for the New York Knicks in 1951; mayor of Jersey City 1977–1981 (B)
- Edward J. Sparks (1897–1976), diplomat, U.S. ambassador to Bolivia, Guatemala, Venezuela and Uruguay (B)
- J. Parnell Thomas (1895–1970), member of the United States House of Representatives, 1937–1950 (B)
- Harry Lancaster Towe (1898–1977), member of the U.S. House of Representatives, 1943–1951 (B)
- Frank William Towey Jr. (1895–1979), member of the U.S. House of Representatives, 1937–1939 (B)
- Henry Traphagen (1842–1918), mayor of Jersey City 1874–1876
- Joseph Patrick Tumulty (1870–1954), member of the New Jersey General Assembly and Secretary to the President of the United States under Woodrow Wilson (B)
- Joseph W. Tumulty (1914–1996), represented the 32nd Legislative District for a single four-year term in the New Jersey Senate
- T. James Tumulty (1913–1981), member of the U.S. House of Representatives, 1955–1957 (B)
- Charles H. Voorhis (1833–1896), member of the United States House of Representatives from New Jersey, 1879–1881
- Jacqueline Walker (born 1941), served in the New Jersey General Assembly 1984–1986
- John C. White (born 1975), Louisiana state superintendent of education since 2012 who taught at William L. Dickinson High School, 1998–2001

== Religion ==
- Thomas George Fahy (1922–1976), Catholic priest and academic administrator; 14th president of Seton Hall University, serving from 1970 until his death
- John Joseph O'Hara (born 1946), auxiliary bishop of the Roman Catholic Archdiocese of New York (B)

== Sports ==
- Rafael Addison (born 1964), retired basketball player who played professionally for the New Jersey Nets and Phoenix Suns
- Walker Lee Ashley (born 1960), retired American football linebacker who played in the National Football League for the Minnesota Vikings and Kansas City Chiefs
- Willie Banks (born 1969), former Major League Baseball pitcher
- Carl Barisich (born 1951), former defensive tackle for nine seasons between 1973 and 1981 for four different NFL teams (B)
- Paul Berezney (1915–1990), offensive tackle who played in the NFL for the Green Bay Packers between 1942 and 1944 (B)
- Pete Berezney (1923–2008), football tackle who played for the Los Angeles Dons and Baltimore Colts (B)
- Bob Bessoir (1932–2020), college basketball coach who spent his career at the University of Scranton, where he won 552 games and two NCAA Division III national championships
- Jim Boylan (born 1955), basketball coach, who served as the interim head coach for the Chicago Bulls for part of the 2007–08 NBA season and as an interim coach for the Milwaukee Bucks for part of the 2012–13 NBA season (B)
- Donald Copeland (born 1984), former professional basketball player, head coach of the Wagner Seahawks men's basketball team (B)
- Frank Darby (born 1997), wide receiver for the Atlanta Falcons (B)
- Otis Davis (1932–2024), won two gold medals in 400 metre dash and 4 × 400 metres relay at 1960 Summer Olympics, setting a world record in the former event
- Terry Dehere (born 1971), politician, former NBA basketball player
- Dom Flora (1935–2021), All-America basketball player at Washington and Lee University, where he set the team career scoring record
- Arturo Gatti (1972–2009), professional boxer
- Rich Glover (born 1950), former professional football player, who played defensive tackle in the NFL for the New York Giants and Philadelphia Eagles
- Gerald Govan (born 1942), professional basketball player who played in all nine seasons of the original American Basketball Association (B)
- Tom Heinsohn (1934–2020), professional basketball player for the Boston Celtics who was a member of eight NBA Championship teams (1957, 1959–1965) (B)
- Don Holder (1928–2015), gymnast who competed in eight events at the 1952 Summer Olympics (B)
- Lefty Hopper (1874–1959), major league baseball player who pitched in two games in 1898 for the Brooklyn Bridegrooms
- Otis Hughley Jr. (born 1964), basketball coach, head coach of the Alabama A&M Bulldogs men's basketball team (B)
- Bobby Hurley (born 1971), professional basketball player who played for the Sacramento Kings and the Vancouver Grizzlies
- Dan Hurley (born 1973), college basketball player at Seton Hall University and two-time national champion college basketball coach for the University of Connecticut
- Sonny Kiss (born 1993), professional wrestler and dancer
- Johnny Kucks (1932–2013), baseball pitcher for the New York Yankees
- Martin Lang (born 1949), fencer who represented the United States in the individual and team foil events at the 1976 Summer Olympics in Montreal
- Dan Le Batard (born 1968), sportswriter for the Miami Herald and host of The Dan Le Batard Show with Stugotz and Highly Questionable on ESPN
- Ada Lio (born 1974), professional pool player, instructor and health equity professional, who competes on the Women's Professional Billiard Association tour (B)
- Ed Lucas (1939–2021), Emmy-winning blind broadcaster on the YES Network for the New York Yankees
- Demie Mainieri (1928–2019), college baseball head coach who was the first junior college coach to win 1,000 career games
- Roshown McLeod (born 1975), played in three NBA seasons, 1999–2001, for the Atlanta Hawks and Philadelphia 76ers
- John McMullen (1918–2005), naval architect and marine engineer, who was former owner of the New Jersey Devils and Houston Astros (B)
- J. D. Maarleveld (born 1961), offensive tackle who played in the NFL for the Tampa Bay Buccaneers
- Josh A. Moore (born 1980), former NBA basketball player
- Donald Hugh Nagle, karate Grand Master (B)
- Tony Nicodemo (1936–2004), college basketball player who set several records while playing for Saint Michael's College of Vermont in the late 1950s
- Ahmad Nivins (born 1987), power forward at Saint Joseph's University
- Mike O'Koren (born 1958), member of the North Carolina Tar Heels men's basketball team, professional basketball player and coach
- Shaquille O'Neal (born 1972), professional basketball player, originally from Newark
- George Papas (born 1998), professional basketball player for Olympiacos of the Greek Basket League and the EuroLeague (B)
- Bernie Parmalee (born 1967), former NFL running back for the Miami Dolphins and New York Jets
- Bill Perkins (1941–2016), running back in the American Football League for the New York Jets who laterserved two terms in the New Jersey General Assembly (B)
- Stanley Poreda (1909–1983), heavyweight boxer in the 1930s (B)
- Rodrick Rhodes (born 1973), professional basketball player who played for the Houston Rockets, Vancouver Grizzlies and Dallas Mavericks (B)
- David Rivers (born 1965), former NBA player for the Los Angeles Lakers (B)
- Nyree Roberts (born 1976), former professional women's basketball player who played in the WNBA for the Houston Comets and Washington Mystics
- Terrence Roberts (born 1985), former member of the Syracuse Orange men's basketball team
- José Rosado (born 1974), two-time All-Star pitcher for the Kansas City Royals (B)
- Eddie August Schneider (1911–1940), pilot who set airspeed records
- Cody Simon (born 2002), American football linebacker for the Arizona Cardinals
- Walt Singer (1911–1992), end for the New York Giants of the NFL, 1935–1936
- Thomas F. X. Smith (1928–1996), professional basketball player for the New York Knicks in 1951; mayor of Jersey City 1977–1981 (B)
- Jim Spanarkel (born 1957), television analyst who played in the NBA for the Philadelphia 76ers and the Dallas Mavericks (B)
- Andy Stanfield (1927–1985), sprinter and Olympic gold and silver medalist
- Paul Tagliabue (1940–2025), National Football League commissioner 1989–2006 (B)
- George Tardiff (1936–2012), football head coach at Benedictine College and Washburn University (B)
- Tyshawn Taylor (born 1990), basketball player for the Brooklyn Nets
- John Valentin (born 1968), shortstop and third baseman who played for the Boston Red Sox and New York Mets
- Alan Vera (1990–2024), Greco-Roman wrestler
- Elnardo Webster (1948–2022), professional basketball player who played in the American Basketball Association for the New York Nets and Memphis Pros during the 1971–1972 season (B)
- Elijah Williams (born 2002), NFL defensive lineman for the Minnesota Vikings
- Henry Wittenberg (1918–2010), Olympic gold (1948) and silver (1952) medalist, freestyle wrestling (B)
- Warren Wolf (1927–2019), high school football head coach and politician who served as an Ocean County freeholder and in the New Jersey General Assembly (B)

== Criminals ==
- Mohamed Mahmood Alessa, charged in 2010 with conspiring to join a terrorist group in order to kill, maim and kidnap people outside the United States
- Richard Kuklinski (1935–2006), mob hitman
- Louis Manna (born 1929), former consigliere of the Genovese Crime Family
- "Newsboy" Moriarty (1910–1979), ran the numbers game in Hudson County, New Jersey, and left $2.5 million in the trunk of a car while he was in New Jersey State Prison
