= BESE =

BESE may refer to:

- The Louisiana Board of Elementary and Secondary Education
- A digital media platform founded by Zoe Saldaña
