= Ella Brown =

Ella Brown may refer to:

- Ella Barksdale Brown (1871–1966), American activist, educator and journalist
- Ella Hyatt Brown (born 1997), New Zealand field hockey player
