= Ferris High School =

Ferris High School may refer to several schools in the United States:

- James J. Ferris High School, Jersey City, New Jersey
- Joel E. Ferris High School, Spokane, Washington
- Ferris High School (Ferris, Texas), Ferris, Texas
