= Fernow =

Fernow may refer to:

- Fernow (surname)
- Fernow Experimental Forest, a research forest in Tucker County, Virginia, United States
- Mount Fernow, a mountain of Washington, United States
