= DeNoble =

DeNoble is a surname of French origin, originating as a surname referring to someone of high birth. Notable people with the surname include:

- Jerre DeNoble (1923-2011), American outfielder
- William DeNoble (1924-2007), American trade unionist
