= Bucklin, Missouri =

- City
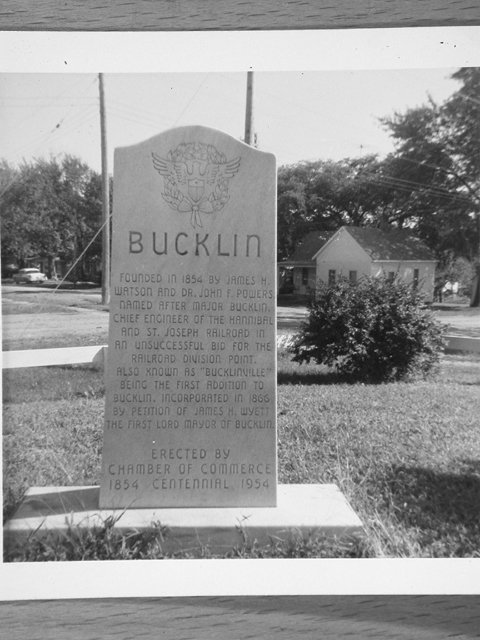
- Informational plaque

- Location of Bucklin, Missouri
- Coordinates: 39°47′01″N 92°53′16″W
- Country: United States
- State: Missouri
- County: Linn

Area
  - Total: 1.18 sq mi (3.06 km^{2})
  - Land: 1.18 sq mi (3.06 km^{2})
  - Water: 0 sq mi (0.00 km^{2})
- Elevation: 906 ft (276 m)

Population (2020)
  - Total: 413
  - Density: 349.5/sq mi (134.94/km^{2})
- Time zone: UTC-6 (Central (CST))
  - Summer (DST): UTC-5 (CDT)
- ZIP code: 64631
- Area code: 660
- FIPS code: 29-09388
- GNIS feature ID: 2393448
- Website: www.bucklinmo.gov

Bucklin is a city in southeast Linn County, Missouri, United States. The population was 413 at the 2020 census.

== History ==
Bucklin was laid out in 1854, and named after James H. Bucklin, a railroad official of the Hannibal and St. Joseph Railroad. A post office called Bucklin has been in operation since 1860. Bucklin was the 1st location of the (1st) Missouri Farmers Association (now called Midwest Farmers Association, more known by the initials of MFA). The building still stands here today abandoned. And is in need of restoring or diminution. It is a hazard to pedestrians with falling bricks.

== Geography ==
Bucklin is located on Missouri Route 129 approximately 5.5 miles northeast of Marceline. The Chicago, Burlington and Quincy Railroad and the Atchison Topeka and Santa Fe Railroad both pass through the community.

According to the United States Census Bureau, the city has a total area of 1.18 square miles (3.06 km^{2}), all land.

== Demographics ==
Historical population
Census	Pop.	Note	%±
1880	430		—
1890	711		65.3%
1900	642		−9.7%
1910	790		23.1%
1920	863		9.2%
1930	932		8.0%
1940	842		−9.7%
1950	783		−7.0%
1960	639		−18.4%
1970	654		2.3%
1980	713		9.0%
1990	616		−13.6%
2000	524		−14.9%
2010	467		−10.9%
2020	413		−11.6%
U.S. Decennial Census

=== 2010 census ===
As of the census of 2010, there were 467 people, 228 households, and 132 families living in the city. The population density was 395.8 inhabitants per square mile (152.8/km^{2}). There were 271 housing units at an average density of 229.7 per square mile (88.7/km^{2}). The racial makeup of the city was 99.4% White, 0.2% Native American, and 0.4% from two or more races. Hispanic or Latino of any race were 1.9% of the population.

There were 228 households, of which 17.5% had children under the age of 18 living with them, 46.9% were married couples living together, 7.5% had a female householder with no husband present, 3.5% had a male householder with no wife present, and 42.1% were non-families. 37.3% of all households were made up of individuals, and 17.1% had someone living alone who was 65 years of age or older. The average household size was 2.05 and the average family size was 2.63.

The median age in the city was 48.8 years. 18.2% of residents were under the age of 18; 5.7% were between the ages of 18 and 24; 20.4% were from 25 to 44; 31.6% were from 45 to 64; and 24% were 65 years of age or older. The gender makeup of the city was 49.9% male and 50.1% female.

=== 2000 census ===
As of the census of 2000, there were 524 people, 241 households, and 145 families living in the city. The population density was 442.6 inhabitants per square mile (170.9/km^{2}). There were 273 housing units at an average density of 230.6 per square mile (89.0/km^{2}). The racial makeup of the city was 98.09% White, 0.57% from other races, and 1.34% from two or more races. Hispanic or Latino of any race were 1.34% of the population.

There were 241 households, out of which 22.0% had children under the age of 18 living with them, 46.5% were married couples living together, 10.4% had a female householder with no husband present, and 39.8% were non-families. 36.5% of all households were made up of individuals, and 23.2% had someone living alone who was 65 years of age or older. The average household size was 2.17 and the average family size was 2.81.

In the city the population was spread out, with 21.4% under the age of 18, 6.5% from 18 to 24, 24.0% from 25 to 44, 22.7% from 45 to 64, and 25.4% who were 65 years of age or older. The median age was 43 years. For every 100 females, there were 91.2 males. For every 100 females age 18 and over, there were 82.3 males.

The median income for a household in the city was $21,490, and the median income for a family was $26,000. Males had a median income of $23,500 versus $19,375 for females. The per capita income for the city was $13,709. About 17.3% of families and 20.0% of the population were below the poverty line, including 39.7% of those under age 18 and 12.9% of those age 65 or over.

== Notable people ==
- Bayard H. Faulkner (1894–1983), Mayor of Montclair, New Jersey, and chairman of the 1950 Commission on Municipal Government that created the Faulkner Act, named in his honor.
