= Cade Brumley =

American educator and state school superintendent

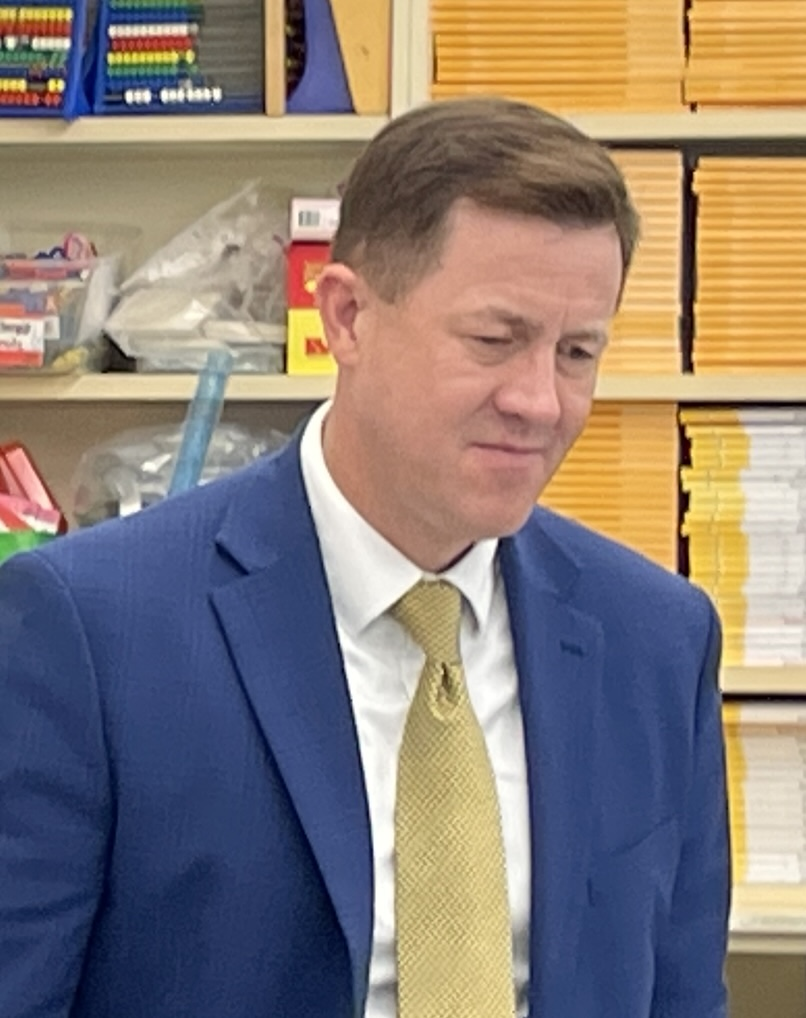

Louisiana Superintendent of Education
- Incumbent
- Assumed office June 8, 2020
- Appointed by: Louisiana Board of Elementary and Secondary Education
- Preceded by: Beth Scioneaux (acting)

Personal details
- Education: Northwestern State University (B.S.); Louisiana State University Shreveport (M.Ed.); Stephen F. Austin State University (Ed.D.)
- Occupation: Educator, administrator

Cade Brumley is an American educator and administrator who has served as the Louisiana Superintendent of Education since June 8, 2020. In November 2026, he was appointed the next president of the University of Louisiana System. A native of Converse in Sabine Parish, he previously served as superintendent of DeSoto Parish Schools and of Jefferson Parish Public Schools, the largest school district in Louisiana.

After Brumley became state superintendent, Louisiana's overall ranking on National Assessment of Educational Progress rose from near the bottom of U.S. states in 2019 to 32nd in 2024, and a joint Harvard–Stanford Education Recovery Scorecard ranked the state first in the nation for reading recovery and second for math following the COVID-19 pandemic. Meanwhile, the most recent ACT data by state, issued in 2024, shows low percentages of Louisiana high schoolers meeting the test's benchmarks by subject, with 46% meeting the English benchmark, 20% meeting the Math benchmark, 32% meeting the Reading benchmark, and 22% meeting the Science benchmark.

== Early life and education ==
Brumley was raised in Converse, a small community in Sabine Parish in northwest Louisiana. He attended Converse High School.

He earned a bachelor's degree from Northwestern State University in Natchitoches, Louisiana, a master's degree in school administration from Louisiana State University Shreveport, and a doctorate in educational leadership or school leadership from Stephen F. Austin State University in Nacogdoches, Texas. He later completed the Harvard Superintendents Academy, a professional development program for school system leaders.

== Early career ==
Brumley began his career as a teacher and coach in Caddo Parish Schools in northwest Louisiana. He later returned to Converse High School in Sabine Parish, where he served as a teacher, coach, assistant principal and eventually principal. He has also taught as an adjunct instructor in higher education, offering courses in education and leadership at multiple universities.

=== DeSoto Parish Schools ===
In 2012 Brumley was appointed superintendent of the DeSoto Parish School System in northwest Louisiana. He led the district for roughly six years, a period during which DeSoto's district performance score moved from near the bottom of Louisiana's 70-plus districts into the top tier and the district received an overall “A” rating from the state accountability system.

During his tenure, DeSoto Parish recorded rising graduation rates, reductions in dropout and suspension rates, and increased participation and performance in Advanced Placement courses, according to district and state summaries cited at the time of his move to Jefferson Parish and later to the state superintendency.

=== Jefferson Parish Schools ===
In 2018 the Jefferson Parish School Board selected Brumley as superintendent of Jefferson Parish Schools, Louisiana's largest school district with about 50,000 students in the New Orleans suburbs. He was sworn in as superintendent in July 2018.

In Jefferson Parish, Brumley oversaw efforts to standardize curriculum across schools, expand Spanish-language offerings, reorganize some schools into K–8 models, and restructure the central office. He worked with local business and labor groups to support a ten-year property tax dedicated to raising pay for teachers and other district employees, which produced one of the larger teacher salary increases in the New Orleans area at the time.

== Louisiana Superintendent of Education ==
=== Appointment and reappointment ===
On May 20, 2020, the Louisiana Board of Elementary and Secondary Education (BESE) voted 8–3 to appoint Brumley as state superintendent of education, succeeding acting superintendent Beth Scioneaux after the resignation of John White. The Louisiana Senate unanimously confirmed his appointment on June 1, 2020, and he assumed office on June 8, 2020.

On January 17, 2024, BESE unanimously voted to reappoint Brumley as superintendent, citing improvements in state and national academic indicators during his first term.

As of 2025, state records show that Superintendent Brumley's total compensation for that fiscal year was $350,717.36.

=== Educational policies ===
Brumley promoted what he called a "back to basics" approach to education, emphasizing reading, mathematics and science. He also supported expanding school choice.

Louisiana's 2021 literacy reforms required training in the science of reading for teachers in kindergarten through third grade and for administrators at schools serving those grades. The Louisiana Department of Education provided tutoring materials and guidance through its Accelerate initiative, which the United States Department of Education cited as an example in its 2021 guidance for reopening schools during the COVID-19 pandemic. Louisiana later expanded its high-dosage tutoring program to more schools.

In 2024, Brumley launched Let Teachers Teach, a workgroup that recommended streamlining professional development requirements and making it easier for teachers to remove disruptive students from class. That year, the Louisiana Legislature created the LA GATOR Scholarship Program to provide eligible families with education savings accounts for approved K–12 expenses.

=== Academic performance and accountability ===
Louisiana was the only state to record a statistically significant increase in fourth-grade reading on the National Assessment of Educational Progress from 2019 to 2024. The Associated Press reported that the gains extended to both higher- and lower-performing Louisiana students. The state's score change from 2022 to 2024 fell short of statistical significance. Brumley attributed the longer-term gains to teacher training, instructional materials and tutoring.

The Harvard–Stanford Education Recovery Scorecard ranked Louisiana first in reading recovery and second in mathematics recovery from 2019 to 2024. Louisiana was the only state in the analysis to exceed its 2019 averages in both subjects.

In 2024, the Louisiana Board of Elementary and Secondary Education approved a revised school grading system for the 2025–26 school year. The system measures academic growth and proficiency and gives high schools credit for students who complete college, career or military service pathways. State officials projected that fewer schools would receive A or B grades under the revised formula.

=== Litigation and political decisions ===
In 2024 the Louisiana Legislature enacted House Bill 71, a law requiring public K–12 and postsecondary classrooms in the state to display a poster-sized font-specific copy of the Protestant version of the Ten Commandments. Brumley had no part in the passage of the law, but in his official capacity as state superintendent he was chosen as the named defendant in the federal lawsuit Roake v. Brumley filed by parents and civil-liberties organizations challenging the law.

In February 2025, following guidance from the U.S. Department of Education under President Donald Trump’s administration concerning the use of race-conscious practices in education, Brumley sent a letter to Louisiana K–12 system leaders urging compliance with the federal directive and with a state executive order limiting diversity, equity and inclusion initiatives in public schools. In the letter he wrote that discrimination on the basis of race, color or national origin is “illegal and morally reprehensible” and advised districts to review programs and awards for compliance with the new federal and state guidance.

== Personal life ==
Brumley is married to Toni Vail, a fellow Northwestern State University graduate. They have two sons.

== See also ==
- Louisiana Department of Education
- Louisiana Board of Elementary and Secondary Education
