= 1984 United States Senate election in New Jersey =

- November 6, 1984
- Turnout: 79% (▲22pp)
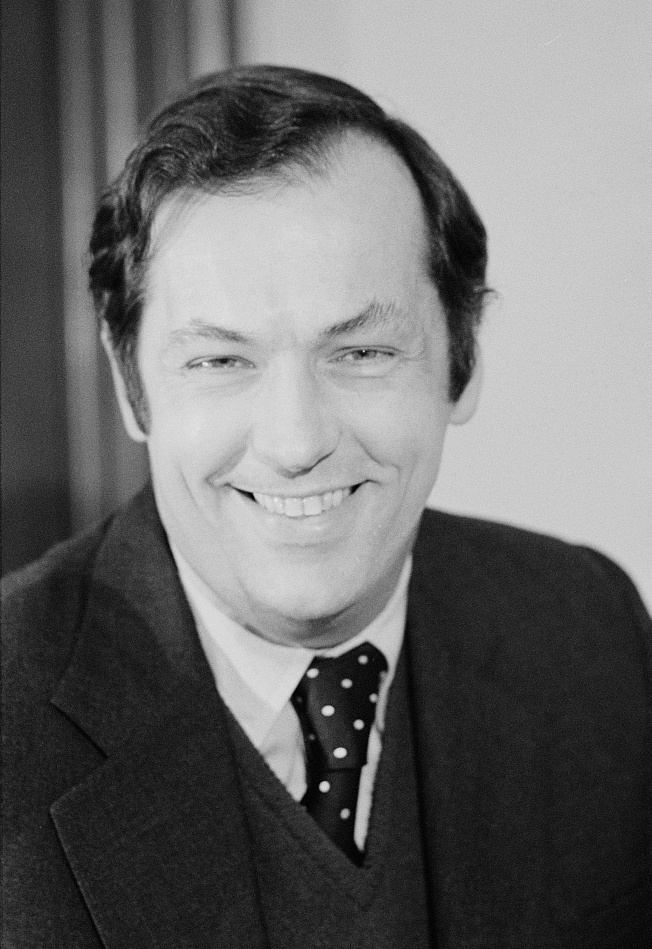

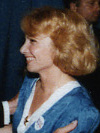
Nominee	Bill Bradley	Mary V. Mochary
Party	Democratic	Republican
Popular vote	1,986,644	1,080,100
Percentage	64.16%	34.88%
- Bradley: 50–60% 60–70% 70–80% 80–90%
U.S. senator before election
Bill Bradley
Democratic
Elected U.S. Senator
Bill Bradley
Democratic

The 1984 United States Senate election in New Jersey was held on November 6, 1984. Incumbent Democrat Bill Bradley defeated Republican nominee Mary V. Mochary with 64.16% of the vote, winning every county in the state.

To date, this is the most recent time Sussex and Warren counties were won by a Democrat in a statewide election. This is the first election since 1888 that a Democrat was re-elected to this seat, and the first time ever that they were popularly re-elected to this seat.

== Primary elections ==
Primary elections were held on June 5, 1984.

=== Democratic primary ===
==== Candidates ====
- Bill Bradley, incumbent U.S. Senator
- Elliot Greenspan, perennial candidate

==== Results ====
Democratic primary results
Party	Candidate	Votes	%
Democratic	Bill Bradley (incumbent)	404,301	92.95%
Democratic	Elliot Greenspan	30,680	7.05%
Total votes		434,981	100.00%

=== Republican primary ===
==== Candidates ====
- Mary V. Mochary, Mayor of Montclair
- Robert J. Morris, anti-communist activist

==== Results ====
Republican primary results
Party	Candidate	Votes	%
Republican	Mary V. Mochary	111,851	61.37%
Republican	Robert J. Morris	70,418	38.63%
Total votes		182,269	100.00%

== General election ==
A Mochary bumper sticker attempting to tie her campaign to the popular Reagan-Bush ticket.

=== Candidates ===
- Bill Bradley, incumbent Senator since 1979 (Democratic)
- Jasper C. Gould (Independent)
- James T. Hagen (Independent)
- Harold F. Leiendecker (Libertarian)
- Jules Levin (Socialist Labor)
- Mary V. Mochary, mayor of Montclair (Republican)
- Priscilla Schenk (Socialist Workers)

=== Campaign ===
Mochary was forced to suspend her campaign in October due to her husband's life-threatening illness. She traveled with her husband to Stanford, California for an experimental heart transplant.

=== Results ===
1984 United States Senate election in New Jersey
Party	Candidate	Votes	%	±%
Democratic	Bill Bradley (incumbent)	1,986,644	64.16%	+8.84%
Republican	Mary V. Mochary	1,080,100	34.88%	−8.25%
Independent	James T. Hagen	10,409	0.34%	N/A
Libertarian	Harold F. Leiendecker	7,135	0.23%	+0.03%
Socialist Labor	Jules Levin	6,053	0.20%	+0.07%
Socialist Workers	Priscilla Schenk	3,224	0.10%	−0.02%
Independent	Jasper C. Gould	2,891	0.09%	−0.06%
Total votes		3,096,456	100.00%	
Democratic hold				

==== Results by county ====
County	Bradley votes	Bradley %	Mochary votes	Mochary %	Other votes	Other %
Atlantic	47,478	60.9%	29,447	37.8%	1,020	1.3%
Bergen	262,694	63.6%	148,080	35.9%	2,015	0.5%
Burlington	89,463	63.5%	50,653	36.0%	737	0.4%
Camden	137,827	68.1%	60,581	31.3%	1,234	0.6%
Cape May	21,859	54.1%	18,365	45.4%	209	0.6%
Cumberland	29,520	61.0%	17,738	36.7%	1,097	2.3%
Essex	219,902	73.4%	76,179	25.4%	3,530	1.1%
Gloucester	56,072	64.8%	30,096	34.8%	421	0.5%
Hudson	137,352	68.6%	60,844	30.4%	1,978	0.9%
Hunterdon	20,864	53.1%	17,839	45.4%	611	1.5%
Mercer	94,782	72.0%	35,745	27.2%	1,036	0.8%
Middlesex	172,478	66.4%	83,617	32.2%	3,699	1.4%
Monmouth	142,084	63.4%	80,093	35.7%	1,914	0.8%
Morris	106,678	57.5%	77,683	41.9%	1,154	0.6%
Ocean	94,076	54.7%	75,923	44.1%	2,033	1.2%
Passaic	101,217	62.0%	59,468	36.4%	2,606	1.6%
Salem	15,900	60.7%	10,099	38.5%	207	0.8%
Somerset	55,757	58.0%	38,862	40.4%	1,562	1.6%
Sussex	25,334	53.8%	21,494	45.6%	264	0.5%
Union	142,320	65.0%	74,446	34.0%	2,102	0.9%
Warren	18,987	58.4%	13,248	40.7%	283	0.9%

Counties that flipped from Republican to Democratic

- Hunterdon
- Morris
- Ocean
- Somerset
- Sussex
- Cape May
