= Kismet (1955 film) =

1955 American musical film

- Theatrical release poster
- Directed by: Vincente Minnelli; Stanley Donen (uncredited)
- Written by: Charles Lederer; Luther Davis
- Based on: Kismet; 1911 play by Edward Knoblock
- Produced by: Arthur Freed
- Starring: Howard Keel; Ann Blyth; Dolores Gray; Vic Damone
- Cinematography: Joseph Ruttenberg
- Edited by: Adrienne Fazan
- Music by: Alexander Borodin; Bob Wright; George Forrest; Music supervised and conducted by André Previn; Jeff Alexander
- Production company: Metro-Goldwyn-Mayer
- Distributed by: Loew's, Inc.
- Release date: December 23, 1955
- Running time: 103 minutes
- Country: United States
- Language: English
- Budget: $3,015,000
- Box office: $1,827,000

Kismet is a 1955 American musical-comedy film directed by Vincente Minnelli and produced by Arthur Freed. It was filmed in CinemaScope and Eastmancolor and released by Metro-Goldwyn-Mayer. It stars Howard Keel, Ann Blyth and Vic Damone.

It is the fifth movie version of Kismet. The first was released in 1914, the second in 1920, the third in 1930 by Warner Brothers, and the fourth, starring Ronald Colman and Marlene Dietrich, by MGM in 1944. The 1955 film is based on the successful 1953 stage musical Kismet, while the four earlier versions are based on the original 1911 play by Edward Knoblock.

== Plot ==
In old Baghdad, an impoverished poet, who has usurped the customary prime “begging spot” of the Mecca-bound Hajj the Beggar, is abducted and brought to the desert tent of Jawan, a notorious elderly brigand. The Poet has been mistaken for Hajj the Beggar, who cursed Jawan fifteen years ago. As a result of the curse, Jawan's beloved young son was kidnapped, and Jawan longs to find his son before he dies. Recognizing an opportunity in the mistaken identity, the Poet asks for one hundred gold pieces to reverse the curse. Jawan agrees, gives him a bag full of money, and returns to Baghdad to look for his son.

In Baghdad, the Poet buys a luxurious house and slave girls and gives his daughter, Marsinah, money as befitting her new status. Dressed in new lavish clothes and jewels, Marsinah meets and falls in love with the young Caliph, who has been traveling incognito, passing as a humble gardener. Exchanging repartee on life and love, they are mutually attracted, culminating in vows of love. They arrange to meet again that night.

The Poet is arrested because his purse carries the insignia of a wealthy family that was robbed. At the Wazir's court, the Poet defends himself against the charge of robbery. When threatened with having his hand cut off, he curses the Wazir. Jawan, brought before the Wazir on another charge, confirms the Poet's story and then notices a familiar amulet around the Wazir's neck that matches one worn by Jawan. Jawan credits the Poet with lifting the curse and restoring his son to him that very day. Convinced of the Poet’s power, the Wazir nevertheless condemns Jawan to death, declaring that the police Wazir cannot be known to be the son of the most infamous criminal.

The Caliph announces that he will take a bride that night, foiling the Wazir, who has a badly needed loan riding on persuading the Caliph to marry a princess of Ababu. Attributing the Poet's curse as the cause, the Wazir offers to make the Poet an Emir if he reverses the curse. The Poet happily accepts and is confined to the Wazir's palace. The Wazir's favorite wife, Lalume, is attracted to the handsome poet. The two realize they have similar temperaments and scheme to take advantage of the Wazir’s gullibility.

With Lalume's help, the Poet orchestrates an elaborate "curse-reversal" scheme that enables him to "disappear" from the palace. Finding Marsinah, he convinces her that he will be killed unless they flee Baghdad before the Caliph's wedding to his bride exposes the sham curse-reversal. Marsinah wants to keep her rendezvous with her beloved "gardener"; despite Marsinah's protests, they flee. Word spreads that the Caliph's bride was not there when the Caliph came to claim her. Since the "curse reversal" seems to have worked, the Poet returns to the palace to resume his Emir status.

The Poet tells Lalume that he is worried about Marsinah, and Lalume suggests that she come to the palace. Marsinah arrives and confesses that she has fallen in love but does not know her beloved's name. Lalume hides Marsinah in the harem for her own protection, but there the Caliph sees her and believes her to be a wife of the Wazir, therefore ineligible to be his own bride. When the Wazir privately congratulates the Poet on hiding the Caliph's true love in the Wazir's own harem, the Poet realizes that Marsinah is the Caliph's beloved.

At a ceremony planned to choose a new bride, the Poet tricks the Wazir and attempts to drown him in front of the Caliph and the spectators while asking the Caliph how he would punish treachery. For his attack on the Wazir, the Caliph sentences the Poet to death, but Lalume saves the day as Marsinah is revealed to be the Poet's daughter and the victim of the Wazir's scheming. The Caliph sentences the Wazir to death and the Poet to exile. The Poet, the Caliph's father-in-law-to-be, asks to take along the soon-to-be-widowed Lalume with the remains of the Wazir's estate. Thus the Poet weds Lalume and the Caliph weds Marsinah—all in the course of a single day.

== Cast ==
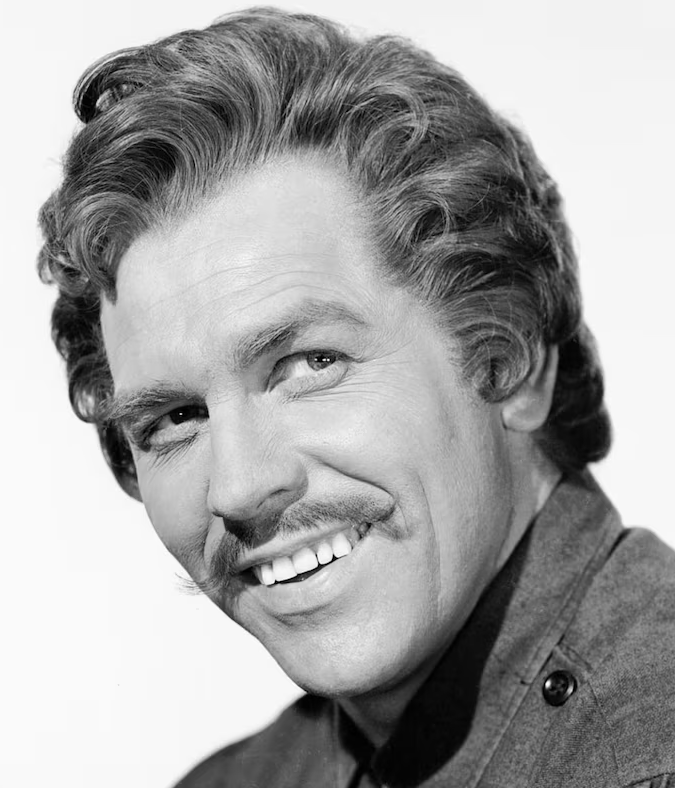
Howard Keel plays "The Poet"

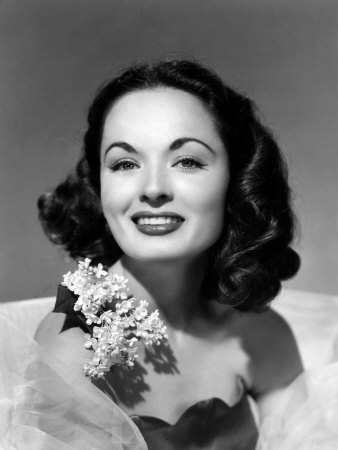
Ann Blyth plays Marsinah

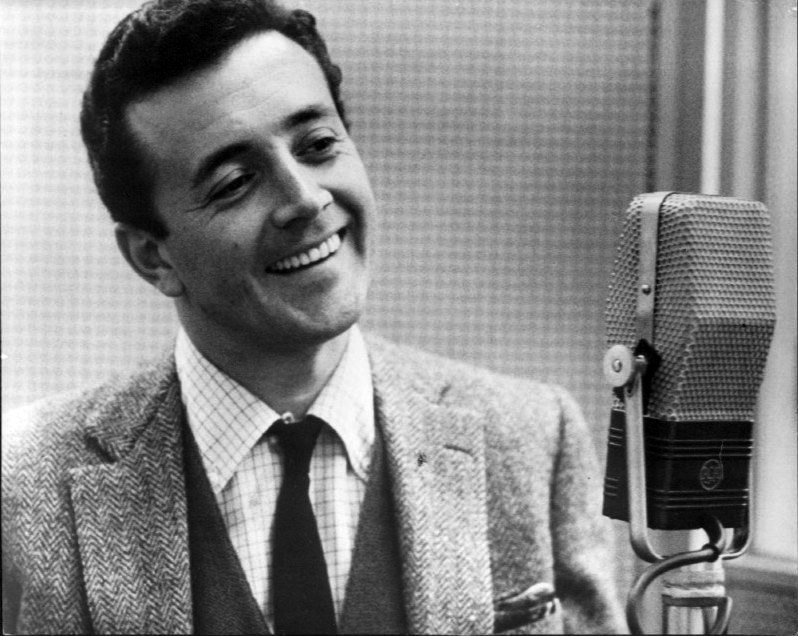
Vic Damone plays the Caliph

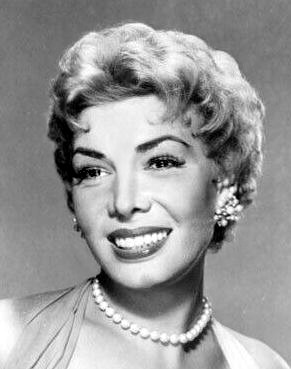
Dolores Gray plays Lalume

- Howard Keel as The Poet
- Ann Blyth as Marsinah
- Dolores Gray as Lalume
- Vic Damone as The Caliph
- Monty Woolley as Omar
- Sebastian Cabot as The Wazir
- Jay C. Flippen as Jawan
- Mike Mazurki as The Chief Policeman
- Jack Elam as Hasan-Ben
- Ted de Corsia as Police Sub-altern
- Pat Sheehan as Harem Girl
- Barrie Chase as Harem Girl
- June Kirby as Harem Girl
- Suzanne Ames as Harem Girl
- Jamie Farr as Orange Merchant

== Songs ==
- "Rhymes Have I"
- "Fate"
- "Not Since Nineveh"
- "Baubles, Bangles, and Beads"
- "Stranger in Paradise"
- "Gesticulate"
- "Bored"
- "Night of My Nights"
- "The Olive Tree"
- "And This Is My Beloved"
- "Rahadlakum"
- "Sands of Time"

== Reception ==
According to MGM records the film earned $1,217,000 in the US and Canada and $610,000 elsewhere resulting in a loss of $2,252,000.

The film was nominated for the American Film Institute's 2006 list of AFI's Greatest Movie Musicals.

"Stranger in Paradise" was nominated for the 2004 list AFI's 100 Years...100 Songs.

== See also ==
- List of American films of 1955
