= Fearon Wright =

Jamaican gridiron football player (born 1978)

No. 59
- Position: Linebacker

Personal information
- Born: September 30, 1978 (age 48); Jamaica
- Listed height: 6 ft 2 in (1.88 m)
- Listed weight: 235 lb (107 kg)

Career information
- High school: James J. Ferris (Jersey City, New Jersey)
- College: Rhode Island
- NFL draft: 2001: undrafted

Career history
- Minnesota Vikings (2001); Carolina Speed (2008); Baltimore Mariners (2009–2011); Harrisburg Stampede (2012)

Awards and highlights
- AIFA champion (2010)

Career NFL statistics
- Total tackles: 2
- Stats at Pro Football Reference

Fearon Kenroy Wright (born September 30, 1978) is a Jamaican-born former American football linebacker. He played college football at Rhode Island. Professionally, he played one season for the Minnesota Vikings in 2001 before a season ending injury. He made a comeback to pro football with the American Indoor Football Association in 2008.

== Early life and college career ==
Born in Jamaica, Wright emigrated to the U.S. with his mother at age 13. Wright graduated from James J. Ferris High School in Jersey City, New Jersey.

Wright began his college football career at the junior college level at Dean College, where he was the leading tackler with 68 tackles and honorable mention all-conference in 1998. Wright transferred to the University of Rhode Island, where he played for the Rhode Island Rams at defensive end from 1999 to 2000. In 1999, Wright had 24 total tackles, one fumble recovery, and one pass deflected. A team co-captain in 2000, Wright started all 11 games and had 76 tackles, including a team leading 14 tackles for loss. He also had seven sacks, three forced fumbles, two fumble recoveries, and three passes deflected.

== Pro career ==
After the 2001 NFL draft, Wright signed with the Minnesota Vikings as an undrafted free agent on May 31, 2001, as a linebacker. Playing mostly on special teams, Wright had two tackles in seven games. However, Wright had a season ending shoulder injury and was placed on injured reserve in November; the Vikings eventually released Wright on February 21, 2002. Wright retired from football after being released.

In 2008, Wright returned to pro football with the Carolina Speed of the American Indoor Football Association (AIFA). He then played for the Baltimore Mariners from 2009 to 2011, winning the AIFA championship in 2010, before playing for the Harrisburg Stampede in 2012.

== Outside of football ==
Wright has also been a motivational speaker. He and Baltimore Mariners teammate Isaiah Grier made guest appearances on The Steve Wilkos Show episode "Teen Boys in Trouble" aired on April 15, 2010, talking teenage boys against joining a gang. Wright then appeared on the Wilkos episode "I'm Black, But I Want To Be White" in 2011.
