= Mary V. Mochary =

American politician (born 1942)

Mary Mochary
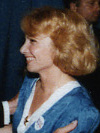
- Mochary, c. 1980

Mayor of Montclair
- In office 1980–1984
- Preceded by: Grant Gille
- Succeeded by: James Ramsey

Personal details
- Born: Mária Veronika Kasser; September 2, 1942 (age 84) Budapest, Hungary
- Party: Republican
- Spouse: Stephen Mochary (m. 1965)
- Children: Alexandra; Matthew
- Education: Wellesley College (BA); University of Chicago (JD)

Mary Veronica Kasser Mochary (née Kasser; born September 2, 1942) is an American attorney, philanthropist, farmer and politician who served as Mayor of Montclair, New Jersey between 1980 and 1984 for the Republican Party as well as Principal Deputy Legal Advisor at the United States Department of State. In 1984, she was the Republican nominee for United States Senate against incumbent Bill Bradley, but lost by a wide margin.

== Early life and education ==
Mochary was born Mária Veronika Kasser on September 2, 1942 in Budapest, Hungary, the second of two children, to Alexander Sandor Kasser (né Sándor Kaszer; 1909–1997), a chemical engineer and industrial manager, and Elizabeth Kasser (née Aranyi; 1920–2002). Her older brother, Michael Istvan Kasser (born 1940), is an entrepreneur in the real estate industry on Hawaii.

Her father was the general director of Neményi Testvérek Papírgyár Rt. (English: Neményi Brothers Paper Factory Ltd.), which was the largest paper mill in Eastern Europe at the time. The family left Hungary at the end of World War II emigrating to the United States on private sponsorship of a business associate of her fathers via Mexico. She became a naturalized U.S. citizen in 1956.

In 1951, the family settled in Montclair, New Jersey, where Mochary attended local schools and graduated from Montclair State College High School, an experimental high school at Montclair State College (now Montclair State University). She graduated from Wellesley College in 1963 with a B.A. degree in economics and from the University of Chicago Law School in 1967 with a J.D. degree.

== Career ==
In 1980, Montclair's form of government changed from a five-member commission to a seven-member council. Mochary ran for the Council, and out of 28 candidates in the nonpartisan municipal election she received the most votes, leading to her selection as mayor of Montclair, New Jersey from 1980 to 1984.

State Republican leaders tried to recruit Mochary to run for Congress and to oppose New Jersey Senate President Carmen A. Orechio in 1983. She then emerged as a potential candidate to oppose Bill Bradley in the 1984 U.S. Senate race. After declaring her candidacy she defeated Robert Morris of Mantoloking in the Republican primary. The Almanac of American Politics called her an "attractive candidate" to run against Bradley. However, because of the life-threatening illness of her then husband Stephen Mochary, she stopped campaigning in October and traveled with her husband to Stanford, California for his heart transplant, which in 1985, was still considered an experimental operation. Stephen Mochary lived until 2001. She was defeated by Bradley in the general election, losing by a margin of 64.2% to 35.2%.

Mochary later served in the United States Department of State as principal deputy legal advisor to the secretary of state and special negotiator for real estate. She has also served as manager and trustee of the Kasser Family Foundation, overseeing a fund with assets of $2.5 million that awards scholarships to young artists.

== Personal life ==
In 1965 she married Stephen E. Mochary, also a lawyer, and they went into practice together as Mochary & Mochary in Montclair from 1970 to 1985. They have two children, Alexandra Kasser and Matthew Mochary.

Party political offices
Preceded by Jeff Bell	Republican nominee for U.S. Senator from New Jersey (Class 2); 1984	Succeeded by Christine Todd Whitman
