= William L. Dickinson High School =

High school in Jersey City, New Jersey, United States

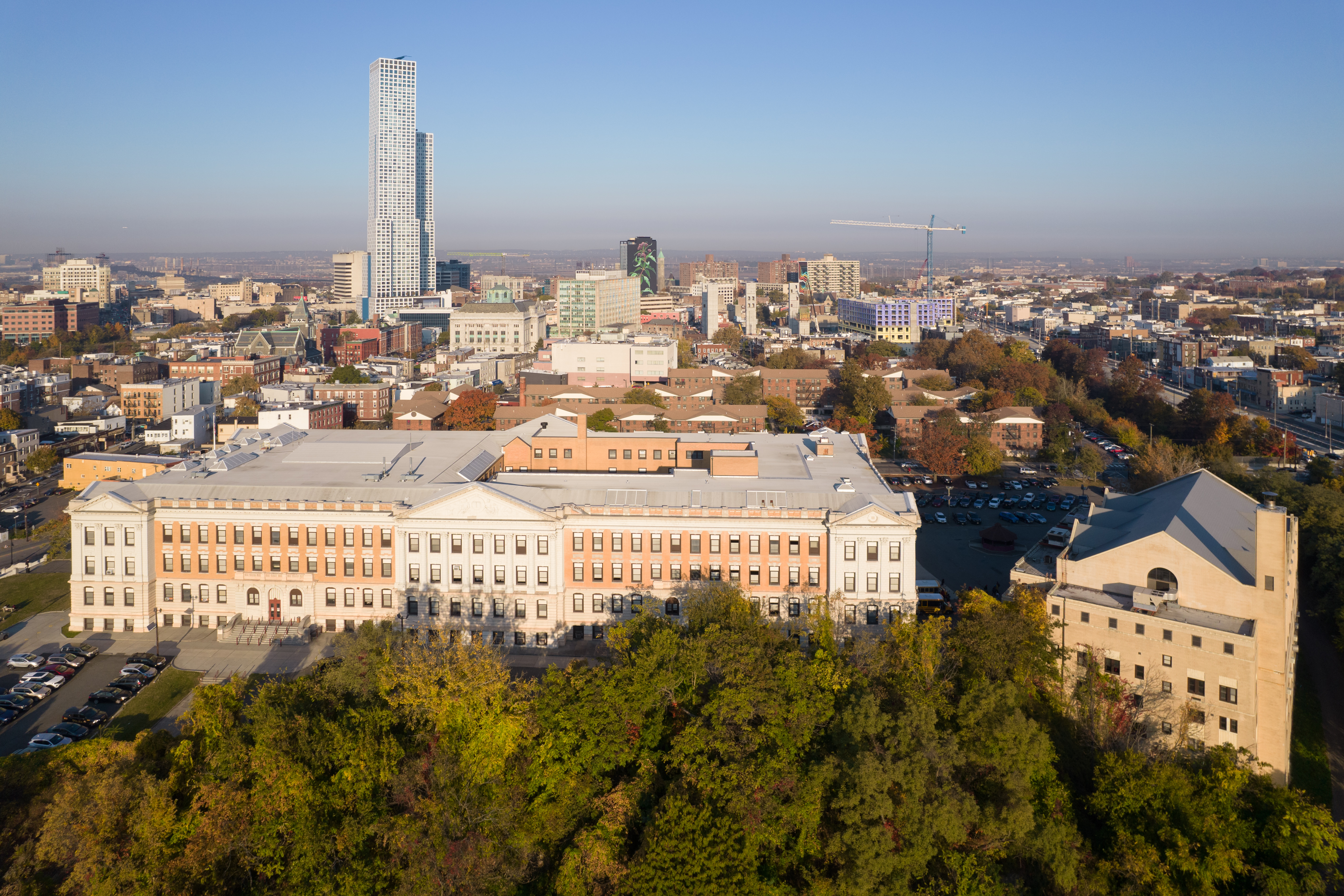

Location
- 2 Palisade Avenue; Jersey City, Hudson County, New Jersey 07306; United States

Information
- Type: Public high school
- Established: 1906
- School district: Jersey City Public Schools
- NCES School ID: 340783002780
- Principal: Gekson Casillas (acting)
- Faculty: 129.2 FTEs
- Grades: 9-12
- Enrollment: 1,856 (as of 2023–24)
- Student to teacher ratio: 14.4:1
- Colors: Maroon and white
- Athletics conference: Hudson County Interscholastic League (general); North Jersey Super Football Conference (football)
- Team name: Rams
- Accreditation: Middle States Association of Colleges and Schools
- Website: wdhs.jcboe.org
- Jersey City High School
- U.S. National Register of Historic Places
- New Jersey Registered Historic Place No. 1514
- Location within Hudson County, New Jersey
- Coordinates: 40°43′48″N 74°03′14″W
- Area: 11 acres (4.5 ha)
- Built: 1906
- Architect: John T. Rowland
- Architectural style: Beaux Arts
- NRHP reference No.: 82003275
- NJRHP No.: 1514

Significant dates
- Added to NRHP: June 1, 1982
- Designated NJRHP: December 23, 1981

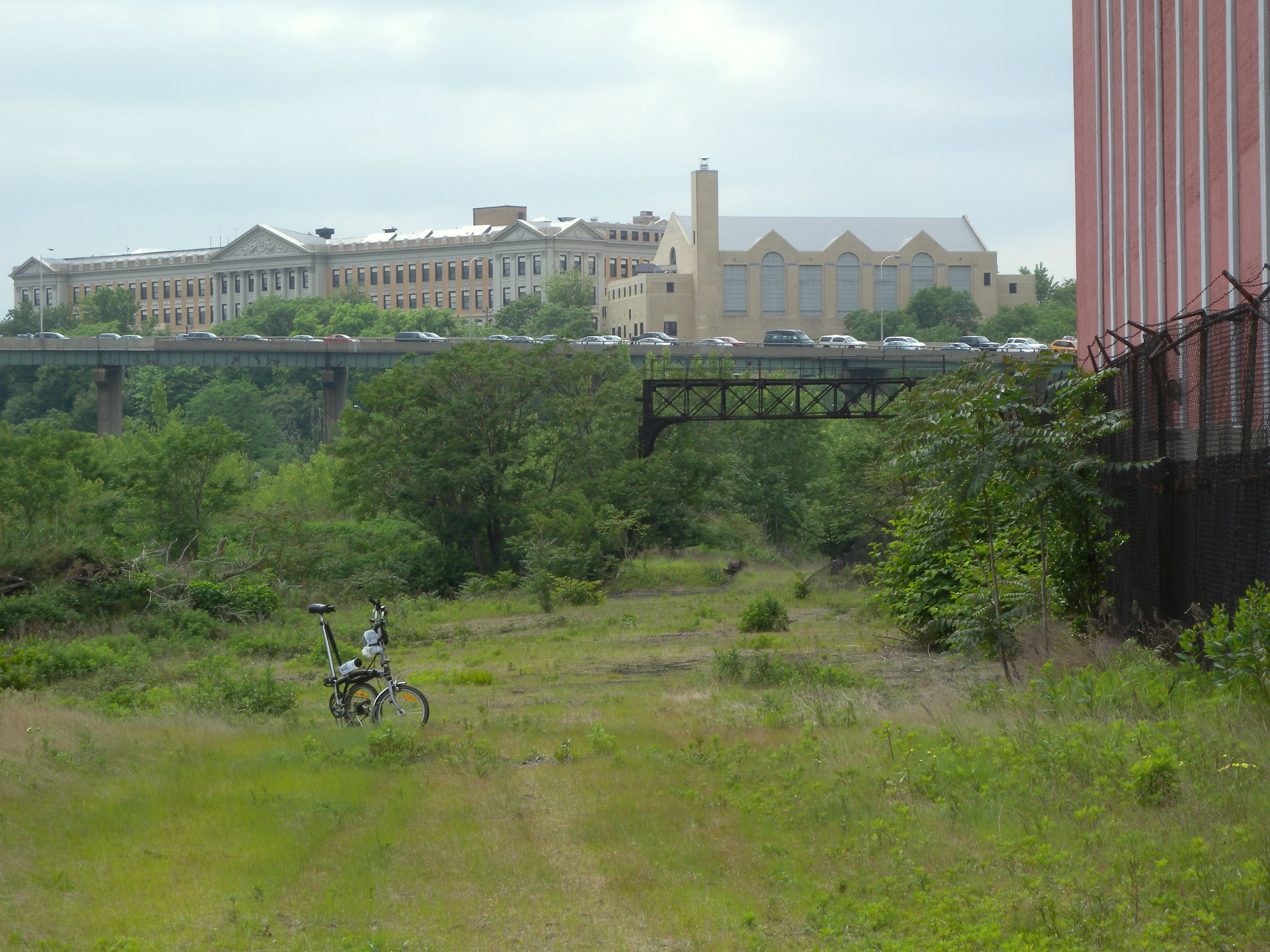
Overlooking lower Jersey City

William L. Dickinson High School is a four-year comprehensive community public high school located in Jersey City, Hudson County, in the U.S. state of New Jersey, serving students in ninth through twelfth grades as part of the Jersey City Public Schools. Dickinson occupies a prominent location on Bergen Hill overlooking lower Jersey City and the New York Harbor. The school has been accredited by the Middle States Association of Colleges and Schools Commission on Elementary and Secondary Schools since 1929.

As of the 2023–24 school year, the school had an enrollment of 1,856 students and 129.2 classroom teachers (on an FTE basis), for a student–teacher ratio of 14.4:1. There were 1,143 students (61.6% of enrollment) eligible for free lunch and 94 (5.1% of students) eligible for reduced-cost lunch.

== Awards, recognition and rankings ==
The school was the 304th-ranked public high school in New Jersey out of 339 schools statewide in New Jersey Monthly magazine's September 2014 cover story on the state's "Top Public High Schools", using a new ranking methodology. The school had been ranked 302nd in the state of 328 schools in 2012, after being ranked 308th in 2010 out of 322 schools listed. The magazine ranked the school 295th in 2008 out of 316 schools. The school was ranked 291st in the magazine's September 2006 issue, which surveyed 316 schools across the state.

In 1999, student Samir Kapadia placed fourth at the Annual Intel International Science and Engineering Fair for his project "Identification and Targeting Multiple Myeloma Cancerous Tumors."

In 2002–03, students Juliet R. Girard and Roshan D. Prabhu won the team competition of the Siemens Westinghouse Competition for "Identification and High Resolution Mapping of Flowering Time Genes in Rice." The duo shared a $100,000 scholarship with their victory.

In 2007, Abdullah Anwar, a student was recognized as a semi-finalist in the 2007 New Jersey Business Idea Competition conducted by Fairleigh Dickinson University.

== History ==
Originally named Jersey City High School, ground was broken in 1904 and the new building opened on September 6, 1906, in an attempt to relieve overcrowding in the city's public schools. Built during the City Beautiful movement, the design of the school is thought to be inspired by the Louvre Colonnade and Buckingham Palace. It was the first public secondary school in the city. When the school opened, it housed a 2,000-seat auditorium that saw extensive public use, and hosted such events as a lecture by Helen Keller and political rallies for United States Presidents Taft, Wilson, and Roosevelt. The original school was expanded with the construction of a second building in 1912 to further industrial skills education. This building contained a foundry, print shop, and vocational classrooms.

In 1913, the school was renamed William L. Dickinson High School for the superintendent who had advocated for creation of the school during his term from 1872 to 1883. The school was expanded again in 1933 with the addition of an annex containing a swimming pool, cafeteria, and gymnasium. That same year, Lincoln High School was opened as the second high school in the district, as part of an effort to provide additional capacity outside of Dickinson.

The rear of the building is the site of a late 1800s-era cannon mount built to protect the Hudson River shoreline from early invaders. Given the location of the cannon and the associated technology of the time, it is doubtful that the cannon would have ever been effective as a defensive emplacement. While the cannon has since been removed, the original mounting was reused as the site of a black-granite monument to the victims of the September 11, 2001, terrorist attacks.

In 1946, students went on strike to protest a proposal by the city's board of education to extend the end of the school day from 1:00 pm to 3:00 pm, with striking students arguing that the longer school day would interfere with their part-time jobs.

== Athletics ==
The William L. Dickinson High School Rams compete in the Hudson County Interscholastic League, which is comprised of public and private high schools in Hudson County and was established following a reorganization of sports leagues in Northern New Jersey by the New Jersey State Interscholastic Athletic Association (NJSIAA). With 1,342 students in grades 10–12, the school was classified by the NJSIAA for the 2019–20 school year as Group IV for most athletic competition purposes, which included schools with an enrollment of 1,060 to 5,049 students in that grade range. The football team competes in the Ivy Red division of the North Jersey Super Football Conference, which includes 112 schools competing in 20 divisions, making it the nation's biggest football-only high school sports league. The football team is one of the 12 programs assigned to the two Ivy divisions starting in 2020, which are intended to allow weaker programs ineligible for playoff participation to compete primarily against each other. The school was classified by the NJSIAA as Group V North for football for 2024–2026, which included schools with 1,317 to 5,409 students.

In 1930, Walt Singer (as an end) and his identical twin brother Milton (at running back) led the Dickinson football team to a 9–0 record as it became the second-ever Hudson County Interscholastic Athletic Association champion.

The Dickinson Rams football team had been led by head coach Rich Glover who had played as a defensive lineman for the New York Giants.

In February 2010, the Jersey City Public Schools cut funding for interscholastic sports and ended the football program at Dickinson. The Dickinson football team was re-established in 2012 after a few years in hiatus; the varsity was scheduled to be back for the 2014 season.

The boys indoor track team was the state public school champion in both 1937 and 1938, and won the Group IV state championship in 1966.

The boys' cross country team won the Group IV state title in 1948 and 1955. The team won the North I Group IV state championship in 1967.

The boys' baseball team won the North I Group IV state sectional championship in 1966, the only time that the team has won a state title in the post-1958 playoff era.

The boys track team won the indoor relay championship in Group IV in 1966 and 1967

The boys' basketball team won the 2000 North I, Group IV sectional title, edging Memorial High School 43–41 in the tournament final.

In 2009, the boys soccer team went on to the state tournament, losing to Ridge High School by a score of 2–0 in the tournament final, finishing with a record of 17–8–0 and marking the first time in Dickinson history that the boys varsity soccer team made it to the state sectional championship.

== Administrators ==
The school's principal is Gekson Casillas. His core administration team includes four vice principals.

== Notable alumni ==
- Akon (born 1973), recording artist
- Paul Berezney (1915–1990), offensive tackle who played in the NFL for the Green Bay Packers between 1942 and 1944
- Pete Berezney (1923–2008), tackle who played two seasons in the All-America Football Conference with the Los Angeles Dons and Baltimore Colts
- Bob Bessoir (1932–2020), college basketball coach who spent his career at the University of Scranton, where he won 552 games and two NCAA Division III national championships
- Al Blozis (1919–1945), player for the New York Giants killed during World War II
- Nate Borden (born 1932), defensive end for the Green Bay Packers and the Dallas Cowboys of the NFL from 1955 to 1962
- James "Koe" Rodriguez (born 1970), Visual artist, Hip-Hop historian and creative professional with film, TV, publishing, and graphic design credits
- John Matthew Cannella (1908–1996), offensive lineman for the New York Giants, later United States federal judge
- Richard Conte (1910–1975), actor in more than 100 films
- Dominick V. Daniels (1908–1987, class of 1925) politician who represented New Jersey's 14th congressional district from 1959 to 1977
- The Duprees, 60s group formed by students from the school
- Edward I. Edwards (1863–1931), attorney, banker and politician who served as Governor of New Jersey and represented the state in the United States Senate
- Michael P. Esposito (1913–1988), politician who served five terms in the New Jersey General Assembly
- Bayard H. Faulkner (1894–1983), Mayor of Montclair, New Jersey, and chairman of the 1950 Commission on Municipal Government that created the Faulkner Act, named in his honor
- Dom Flora (born 1935), basketball player for Washington and Lee University from 1954 to 1958 who graduated as NCAA Division I's fifth–highest scorer
- Ed Franco (1915–1992), played football on the 1936 Fordham University team as one of the "Seven Blocks of Granite"
- James J. Galdieri (1900–1948), served in the New Jersey General Assembly
- Jason Genao (born 1996), actor
- Archimedes Giacomantonio (1906–1988), sculptor who was best known for his busts of noted figures
- Don Holder (1928–2015, class of 1946), gymnast who competed in eight events at the 1952 Summer Olympics
- Johnny Kucks (1932–2013), MLB pitcher for the New York Yankees and Kansas City Athletics
- George McAneny (1869–1953), newspaperman and municipal reformer, who served as Manhattan Borough President from 1910 to 1913 and New York City Comptroller in 1933
- Lillian Morrison (1917–2014), poet, author and librarian
- Mary Teresa Norton (1875–1959), served 13 consecutive terms in the United States House of Representatives, from 1925 to 1951
- Ralph Peduto (1942–2014), film, theater and television actor, who was inducted into the Dickinson High School Hall of Fame in 2000
- Randolph Perkins (1871–1936), politician who represented New Jersey's 6th congressional district from 1921 to 1936
- Mary Philbrook (1872–1958), first female attorney in New Jersey
- Eliu Rivera (1943–2017), politician who served on the Hudson County Board of Chosen Freeholders
- Michelle Rodriguez (born 1978), actress who dropped out in ninth grade, later calling Dickinson "a terrible school!"
- Johnny Roepke (1905–1962), halfback who played in the National Football League for the Frankford Yellow Jackets
- Eddie August Schneider (1911–1940), pilot who set the transcontinental air speed record in 1930 for pilots under the age of 21
- Alexander Simpson (1872–1953), politician who served in both houses of the New Jersey Legislature
- Walt Singer (1911–1992), end for the New York Giants of the NFL from 1935 to 1936
- Joe Sulaitis (born 1921), running back for the New York Giants of the NFL from 1943 to 1953
- Kenneth A. Walsh (1916–1998, class of 1933), United States Marine Corps lieutenant colonel and a Medal of Honor recipient
- Alex Weyand (1891–1982), college football player, Olympic wrestler, United States Army officer and sports historian
- Henry Wittenberg (1918–2010), Olympic gold (1948) and silver (1952) medalist in freestyle wrestling

== Notable faculty ==
- John C. White (born 1975), the Louisiana state education superintendent since 2012, taught English at Dickinson from 1998 to 2001

== See also ==
- Five Corners, Jersey City
- National Register of Historic Places listings in Hudson County, New Jersey
