= Fernow (surname) =

Fernow is a surname. Notable people with the surname include:

- Bernhard Fernow (1851–1923), American forestry academic
- Bernice Pauahi Fernow (1881–1969), American miniature painter
- Berthold Fernow (1837–1908), American historian, writer and librarian
- Dominick Fernow, American musician
- Karl Ludwig Fernow (1763–1808), German art critic and archaeologist
