= Robert Ashby (Tuskegee Airman) =

American pilot (1926–2021)

- Born: Robert Ashby; July 17, 1926; Yemassee, South Carolina, U.S.
- Died: March 5, 2021 (aged 94); Sun City, Arizona, U.S.
- Resting place: Cremated
- Occupations: Military officer; fighter pilot
- Years active: 1944–1965

Robert Ashby (July 17, 1926 – March 5, 2021) was a U.S. Army Air Force/U.S. Air Force officer and pilot with the all-African American 332nd Fighter Group – Tuskegee Airmen. He was one of the 1007 documented Tuskegee Airmen Pilots.

Hired by Frontier Airlines in 1973, Ashby became one of the first few African Americans to work as a commercial airline pilot for a major commercial airline. During his new-hire training class at Frontier, Ashby trained with Emily Howell Warner, the first female ever to be promoted to airline captain at a major commercial airline.

Ashby was first and only Tuskegee Airmen to work as a commercial airline pilot captain with a major commercial U.S. airline.

On March 29, 2007, Ashby and the collective Tuskegee Airmen received the Congressional Gold Medal, the highest civilian award presented by U.S. Congress.

== Early life, education, family ==
Ashby was born on July 17, 1926, in Yemassee, in Hampton County, South Carolina. As a child, Ashby delivered the local African American newspaper to earn money. He graduated from James J. Ferris High School in Jersey City, New Jersey.

Years later, Ashby obtained college training with the University of Maryland and UCLA through the “on base” College Program.

== Military service ==
At age 17, Ashby enlisted in the U.S. Army Air Corps's Aviation Cadet program. In August 1944, the U.S. Army stationed Ashby at Keesler Field in Mississippi for both basic training and entrance testing for the Aviation Cadet Program. In December 1944, the U.S. Army transferred Ashby to Tuskegee, Alabama for cadet pilot training on the Stearman PT-17, AT-6, and the B-25.

On November 20, 1945, Ashby graduated with the Tuskegee Cadet Pilot Class TE-45-H, receiving a commission as a 2nd Lieutenant.

The U.S. Air Force transferred Ashby to Japan to aid in the post-World War II preoccupation. However, two all-white flying units refused to allow him to fly based on the unit's de facto racial segregation policies. He was later stationed in South Korea and in Europe, serving as a flight instructor.

In July 1965, Ashby retired from the U.S. Air Force as a Lieutenant Colonel.

== Commercial airline pilot career ==
In 1965, United Airlines hired Ashby as a flight operations instructor, working on the team that developed its inaugural 747-flight training program. Unfortunately, the airline later furloughed Ashby under the “last hired/first fired” to reduce the airline's allegedly bloated pilot roster.

In July 1973, Ashby became one of the first few African Americans to work as a commercial airline pilot for a major commercial airline, Frontier Airlines. In 1963, African-American pilot Marlon Green won a landmark United States Supreme Court decision which helped dismantle racial discrimination in the American passenger airline industry. Green flew for Continental Airlines from 1965 to 1978. Green's case led to African American pilot David Harris' 1964 hire as the very first African-American commercial airline pilot for a major commercial airline.

During his new hire onboarding training at Frontier, Ashby trained with Emily Howell Warner, the first female commercial airline Pilot Captain of a major commercial airline. While at Frontier, Ashby flew the Twin Otter, Convair 580, Boeing 737 and MD-80.

In 1986, Ashby retired from Frontier Airlines with the rank of Captain. He is considered the first African American commercial airline pilot for major commercial airlines to reach the mandatory retirement age of 60. He was the only known member of the Tuskegee Airmen to work as a commercial airline Pilot Captain with a major airlines.

== Death ==
Ashby died on March 5, 2021, in Sun City, Arizona, aged 95. He was cremated. Ashby was one of three last-surviving Tuskegee Airmen living in the U.S. state of Arizona.

== See also ==
- Executive Order 9981
- List of Tuskegee Airmen
- List of Tuskegee Airmen Cadet Pilot Graduation Classes
- Military history of African Americans
