= Ray Radziszewski =

American basketball player

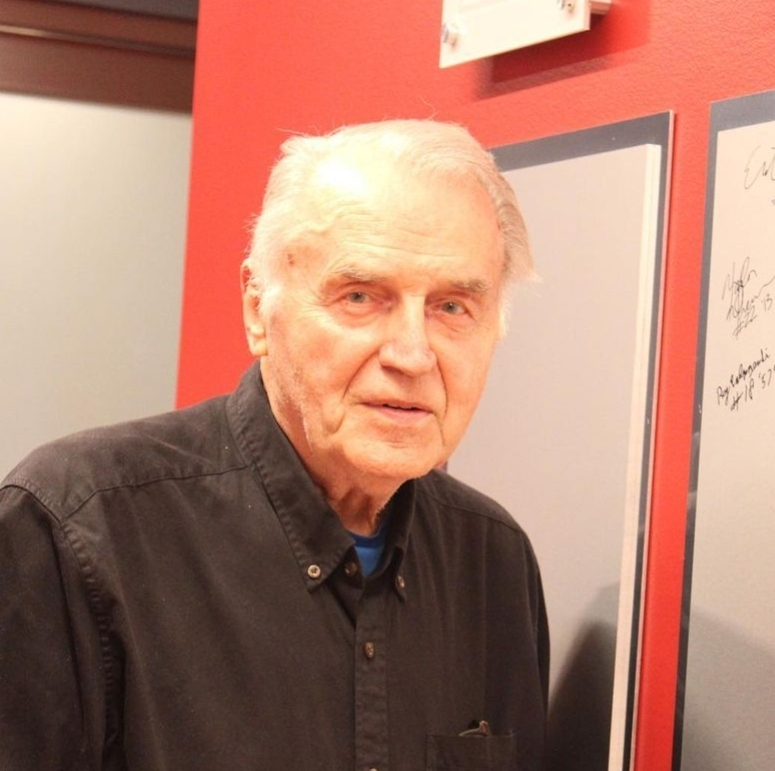
- Radziszewski at Hawk Hill in 2021

Personal information
- Born: March 1, 1935 (age 91) Jersey City, New Jersey, U.S.
- Listed height: 6 ft 5 in (1.96 m)
- Listed weight: 210 lb (95 kg)

Career information
- High school: Ferris (Jersey City, New Jersey)
- College: Saint Joseph's (1954–1957)
- NBA draft: 1957: 4th round, 30th overall pick
- Drafted by: Philadelphia Warriors
- Position: Forward
- Number: 19

Career history
- 1957: Philadelphia Warriors
- 1957–1958: Wilmington Jets
- 1960–1962: Wilkes-Barre Barons
- Stats at NBA.com
- Stats at Basketball Reference

Raymond A. Radziszewski (born March 1, 1935) is an American former professional basketball player who played in the National Basketball Association (NBA). He played college basketball for the Saint Joseph's Hawks.

Radziszewski attended James J. Ferris High School in Jersey City, New Jersey. He graduated at age 16 without any athletic scholarships. Working at a brokerage in New York City, he was playing on the company team when he was noticed by an alumnus of Saint Joseph's University, who arranged a tryout with coach Bill Ferguson of the school's basketball team. Already with a scholarship offer from Saint Michael's College in hand, Radziszewski then received one from Saint Joseph's, which he accepted. He averaged 14.3 points and 15.5 reboiunds as a senior with the Hawks.

Radziszewski was selected by the Philadelphia Warriors in the fourth round of the 1957 NBA draft with the 30th overall pick. He appeared in one NBA game in his career, recording two rebounds and one assist, before he was released. Afterwards, he signed with the Wilmington Jets of the Eastern Professional Basketball League. He later joined the Army, where he played basketball on service teams.

== Career statistics ==
Legend
GP	Games played	GS	Games started	MPG	Minutes per game
FG%	Field goal percentage	3P%	3-point field goal percentage	FT%	Free throw percentage
RPG	Rebounds per game	APG	Assists per game	SPG	Steals per game
BPG	Blocks per game	PPG	Points per game	**Bold**	Career high

=== NBA ===
==== Regular season ====
Year	Team	GP	MPG	FG%	FT%	RPG	APG	PPG
1957–58	Philadelphia	1	6.0	.000	–	2.0	1.0	.0
