= John White (Louisiana politician) =

Politician from Louisiana, born 1975

John Charles White

Louisiana Superintendent of Education
- In office January 2012 – March 11, 2020
- Preceded by: Ollie Tyler (interim)

Superintendent of the Recovery School District of Louisiana
- In office 2011–2012
- Preceded by: Paul Vallas
- Succeeded by: Patrick Dobard

Personal details
- Born: November 1975 (age 50) Washington, D.C., U.S.
- Education: St. Albans School; University of Virginia (BA); New York University (MPA)
- Occupation: Educational administrator

John Charles White (born November 1975) is an American educator and public official who served as the Louisiana Superintendent of Education from 2012 to 2020.

== Education ==
White received a B.A. in English with distinction from the University of Virginia and a Master's in Public Administration from New York University's Robert F. Wagner Graduate School of Public Service. He serves as chairman of the independent non-profit advocacy organization Chiefs for Change, co-founder and chairman of Propel America, and Academic Visitor to the John F. Kennedy School of Government at Harvard University.

== Pre-Louisiana career ==
Prior to being named State Superintendent, White served as Superintendent of the Louisiana Recovery School District. He previously worked under Mayor Michael Bloomberg and Chancellor Joel Klein as Deputy Chancellor for the New York City Department of Education and served as executive director of Teach For America – Chicago and Teach For America – New Jersey. He began his career as an English teacher at William L. Dickinson High School in Jersey City, New Jersey.

== Louisiana State Superintendent ==
White was appointed to the state superintendent position in January 2012 by the Louisiana Board of Elementary and Secondary Education. That year he launched Louisiana Believes., the state's plan to ensure every child is on track to college or a professional career. In the time since, White has worked to unify the state's fragmented early childhood system., to modernize curriculum., to professionalize the preparation of educators., to provide pathways to prosperity for all high school graduates., and to provide families with expansive school options irrespective of their financial means. White announced his resignation on January 8, 2020, effective March 11, 2020.

Louisiana Believes includes nationally recognized initiatives. such as Early Childhood Networks, Louisiana Teacher Leaders, English language arts Curriculum Guidebooks, the Believe and Prepare Teacher Residency, and Jump Start career education. Superintendent White and his team have also led the post-Katrina renovation and unification of schools in New Orleans and the creation of the Baton Rouge Achievement Zone.

Louisiana's class of 2018 included 5,000 more graduates than did the class of 2012. Five thousand more students in that class earned the state's TOPS scholarship, and 5,000 more enrolled in college after graduating high school. In that time, the number of Louisiana students earning Advanced Placement early college credits has increased by 167 percent, and the state leads the nation in the percentage of high school seniors completing an application for higher education financial aid.

Following his resignation in 2020, he was succeeded by Cade Brumley.

== Other activities ==
White's writings on education have been published in The Washington Post, the Wall Street Journal, the Daily Beast, The Hill, and the Brookings Institution’s Evidence Speaks.

Preceded by Ollie Tyler (interim)	Louisiana State Superintendent of Education; 2012–	Succeeded by Incumbent
