= Warren Loving =

American football player (born 1960)

No. 30
- Position: Running back

Personal information
- Born: November 12, 1960 (age 65); Jersey City, New Jersey, U.S.
- Listed height: 6 ft 1 in (1.85 m)
- Listed weight: 230 lb (104 kg)

Career information
- High school: Ferris (Jersey City)
- College: William Penn
- NFL draft: 1986: undrafted

Career history
- Miami Dolphins (1986)*; New York Jets (1987)*; Buffalo Bills (1987)
- * Offseason or practice squad member only

Career NFL statistics
- Games played: 2
- Stats at Pro Football Reference

Warren Eric Loving (born November 12, 1960) is an American former professional football player who was a running back for the Buffalo Bills of the National Football League (NFL) in 1987. He played college football for the William Penn Statesmen. He appeared in two games as part of the Bills' replacement team during the 1987 players' strike. Loving previously participated in the Miami Dolphins training camp before the 1986 NFL season, and was signed by the New York Jets before being cut in September 1987.

Raised in Jersey City, New Jersey, Loving attended James J. Ferris High School.
