= Louisiana Department of Education =

State agency

Louisiana Department of Education (LDOE) is a state agency of Louisiana, United States. It manages the state's school districts. It is headquartered in the Claiborne Building at 1201 North 3rd Street in Baton Rouge. On a previous occasion the department was headquartered at 626 North 4th Street in Baton Rouge. The department is headed by a superintendent, currently Cade Brumley.

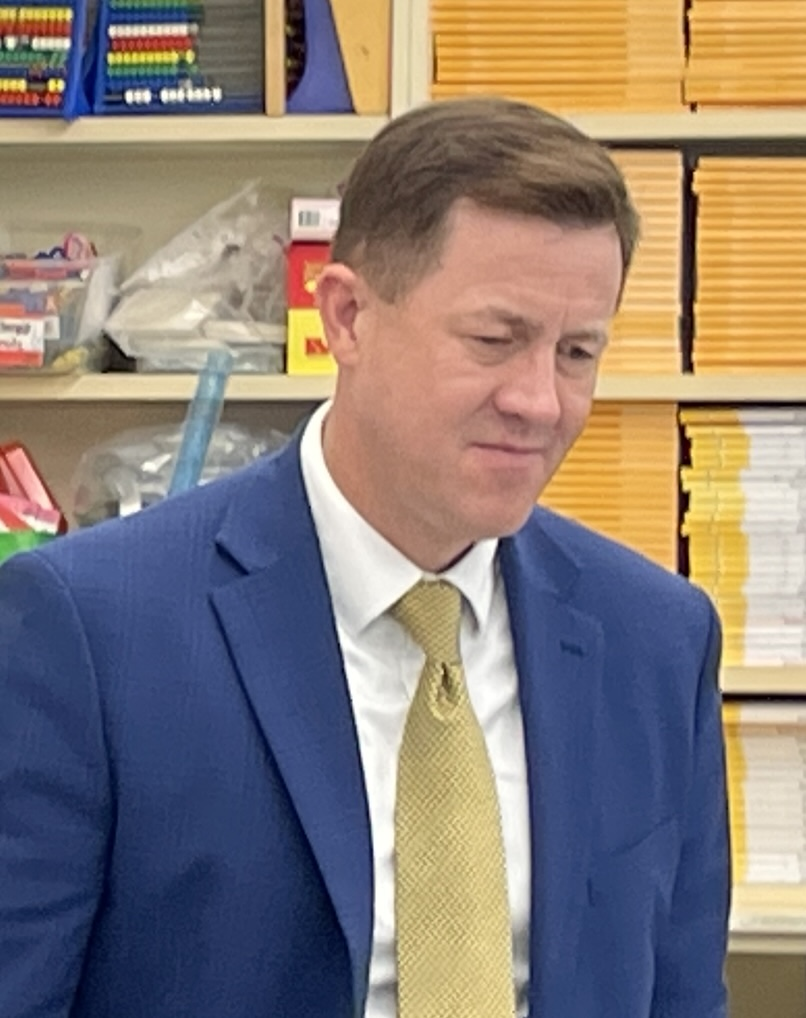
Cade Brumley, the State Superintendent of the Louisiana Department of Education, at Wright Elementary in Tallulah, Louisiana.

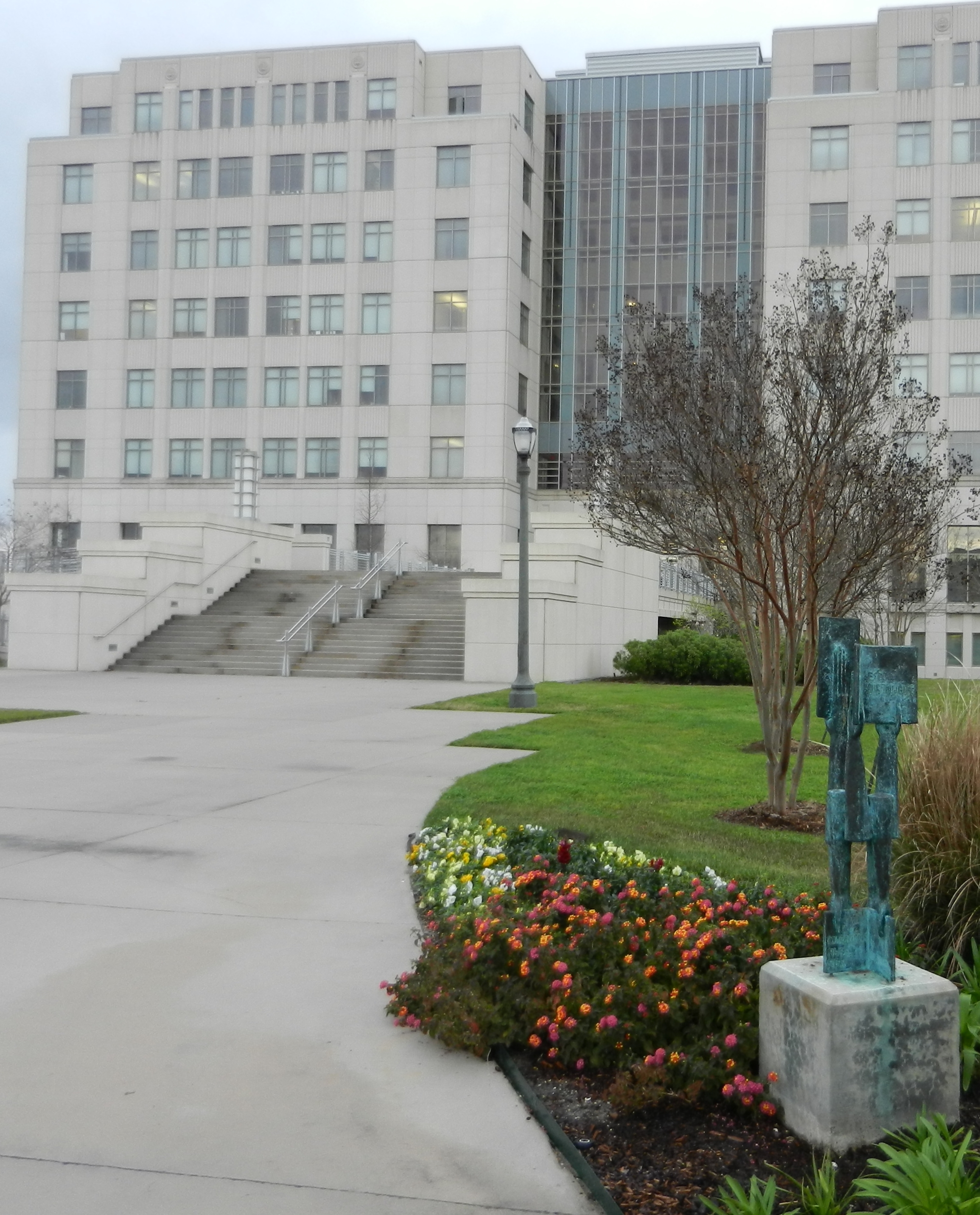
The Louisiana State Claiborne Building houses several state agencies, including the Division of Administration, State Civil Service, Louisiana Department of Education, the Board of Elementary and Secondary Education, the Board of Regents, the University of Louisiana System, and several other state agencies.

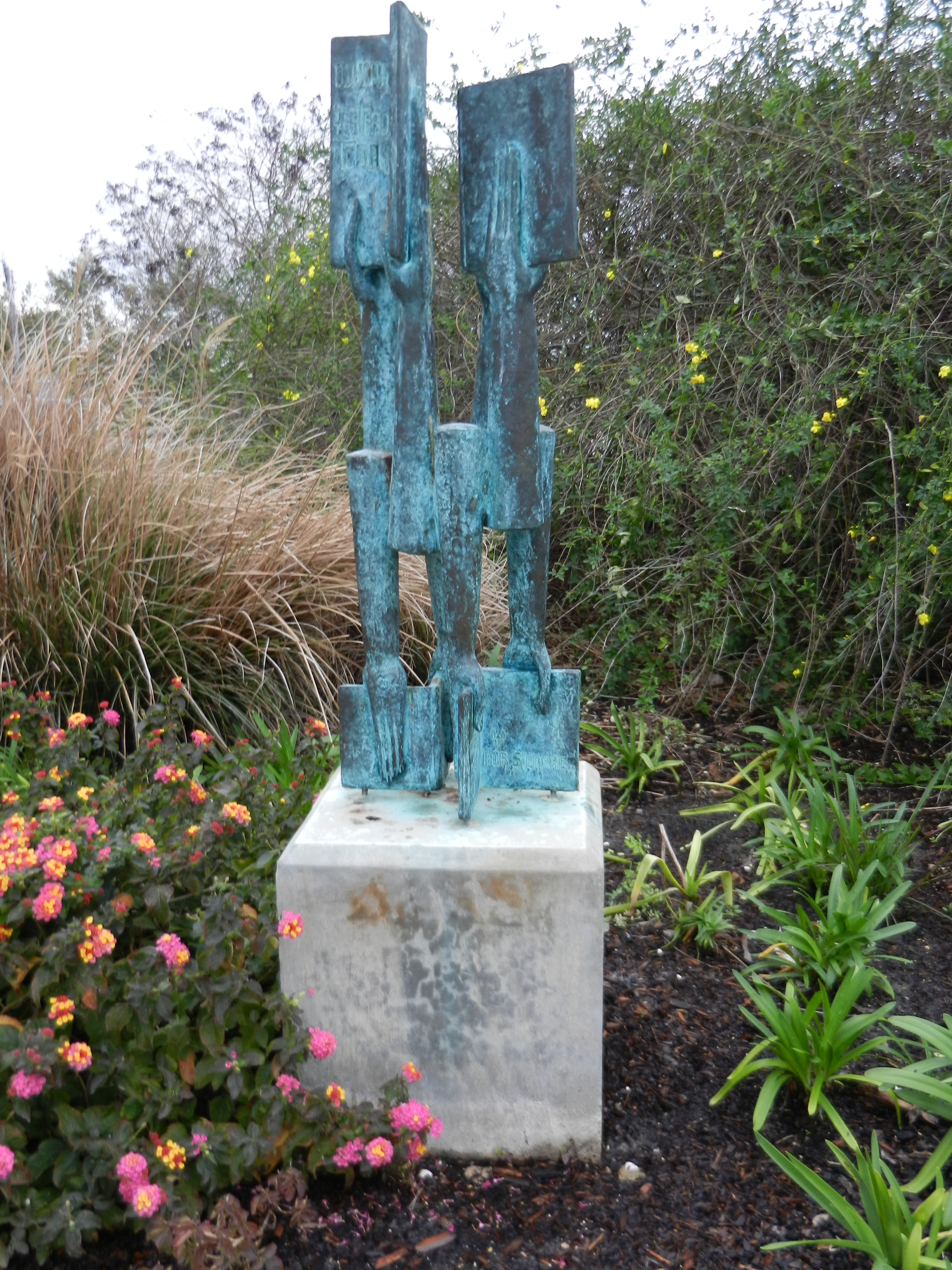
This obscure work of art by noted sculptor Frank Hayden celebrates education (notice the hands holding books).It used to be on display in the (demolished) Education Building, just outside the office of the Louisiana Board of Elementary and Secondary Education.Today, barely noticed outside the Claiborne Building, it is nearly covered by vegetation and exposed to the elements.

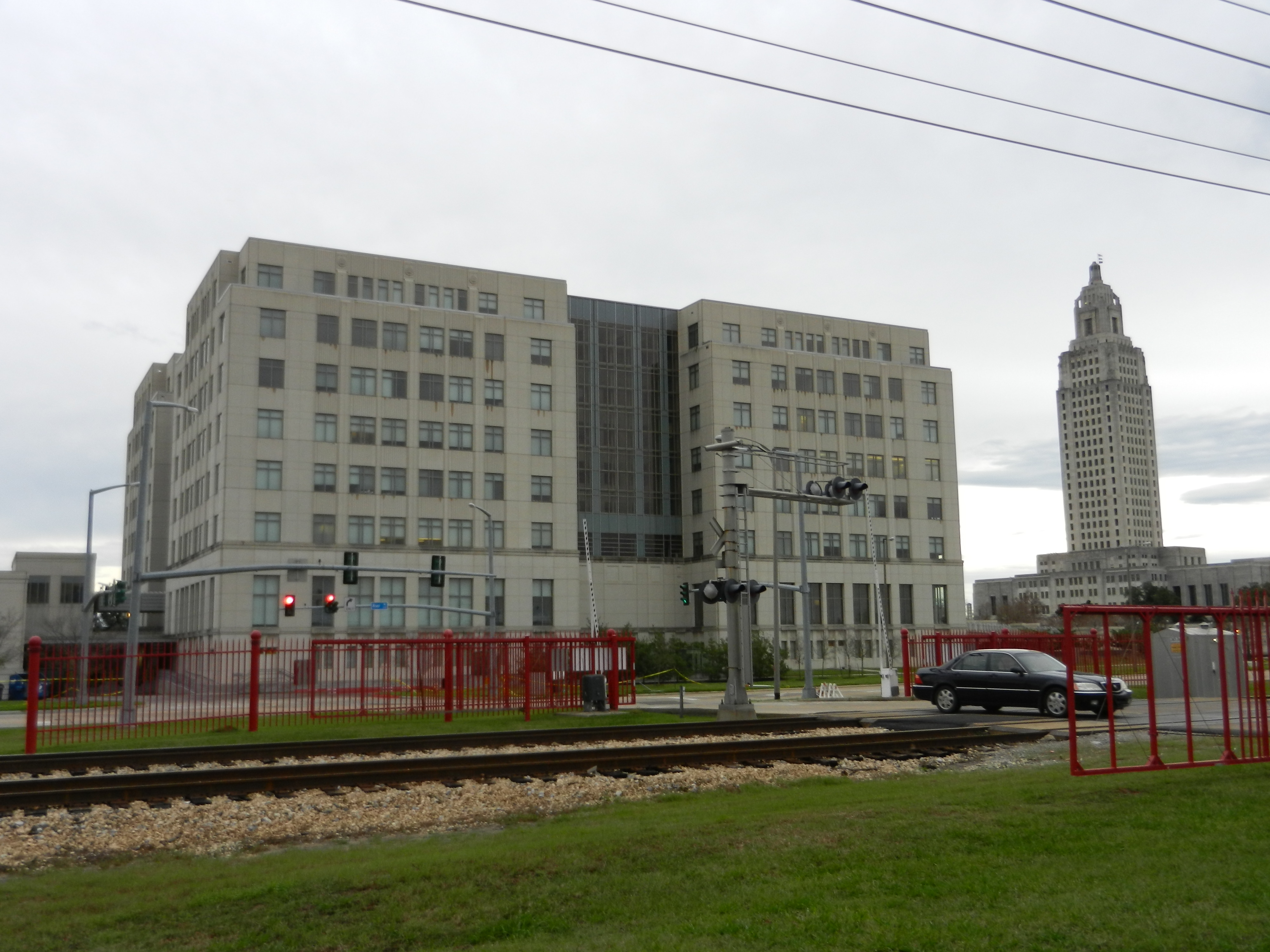
A half-dozen buildings were constructed within a few blocks of the Capitol Building toward the end of former Gov. Mike Foster’s second term. Claiborne Building was one of them and now houses the Department of Education. The old Department of Education building was imploded and a new building built on the site that now houses the Department of Health and Hospitals.

== See also ==
- Louisiana Board of Elementary and Secondary Education
