= Harold S. Osborne =

American electrical engineer

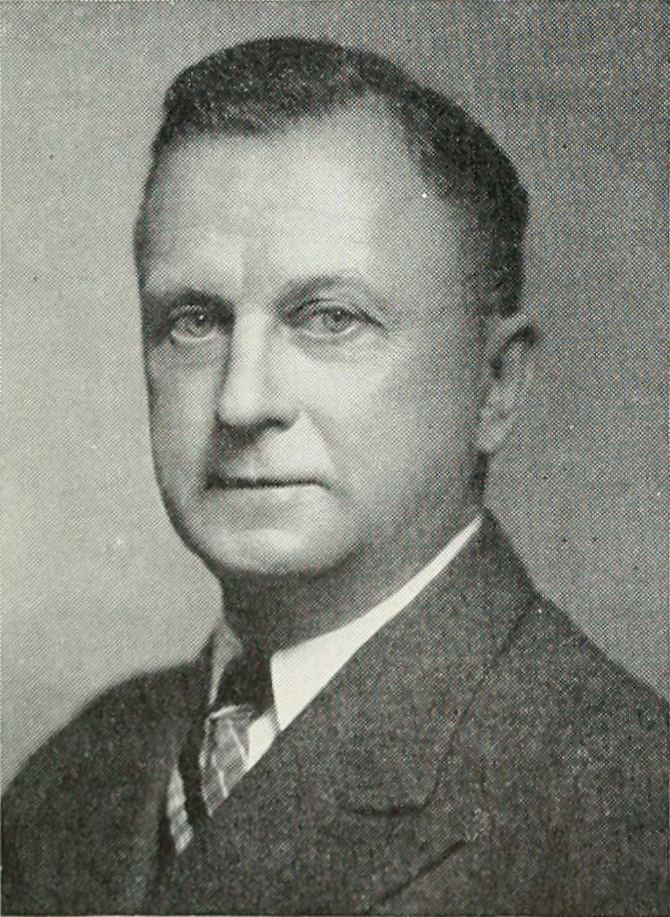
- Born: August 1, 1887; Fayetteville, New York, U.S.
- Died: December 29, 1985 (aged 98); Upper Montclair, New Jersey, U.S.
- Awards: IEEE Edison Medal (1960)
- Scientific career
- Fields: Electrical engineering

Harold Smith Osborne (August 1, 1887 – December 29, 1985) was an American electrical engineer. He worked for the American Telephone & Telegraph Company for forty years, leading the team that developed the system that enabled long-distance dialing. He was president of the Regional Plan Association and served as the mayor of Montclair, New Jersey.

== Early life ==
Osborne was born in Fayetteville, New York. He received an undergraduate and doctoral degree from the Massachusetts Institute of Technology. He married Dorothy Brockway Osborne and they had two daughters, Margaret and Polly.

== Career ==
Osborne worked for the American Telephone & Telegraph Company for forty years, serving as the company's chief engineer between 1943 and 1952, when he retired. While at the company, his team developed the system that enabled long-distance dialing. He was president of the International Electrotechnical Commission (IEC) between 1952 and 1955 and of the U.S. National Committee of IEC. He was a fellow and charter member of the Acoustical Society of America. He served the American National Standards Institute (ANSI) as vice-president, director and chair of the standards council.

Osborne was honored with the ANSI's Howard Coonley Medal and the 75th anniversary medal of the American Society of Mechanical Engineers. He received the IEEE Edison Medal for "contributions to the art of telecommunication and his leadership and vision in extending its application; for his achievements in the coordination of international communication and in national and international standardization; and for his advancement of the engineering profession".

After he retired, he became a consultant and was involved in civic planning. He served as the president of the Regional Plan Association, which promoted development in the New York metropolitan area. It supported suburban business parks such as Stamford, Connecticut, and natural parks, such as the Gateway National Recreation Area and the Fire Island National Seashore. Osborne was the mayor of Montclair, New Jersey, between 1961 and 1964.

== Later life ==
Osborne died on December 29, 1985, at the age of 98.
