= Paul Berezney =

American football player (1915–1990)

Profile
- Position: Offensive tackle

Personal information
- Born: September 25, 1915; Jersey City, New Jersey, U.S.
- Died: March 29, 1990 (aged 74); Toms River, New Jersey, U.S.
- Listed height: 6 ft 2 in (1.88 m)
- Listed weight: 221 lb (100 kg)

Career information
- High school: Jersey City (NJ) Dickinson
- College: Fordham

Career history
- Green Bay Packers (1942–1944); Miami Seahawks (1946)

Awards and highlights
- NFL champion (1944)

Career statistics
- Games: 31
- Games started: 23
- Kick returns: 1
- Stats at Pro Football Reference

Paul Lawrence Berezney (born September 25, 1915 – March 29, 1990) was an American football offensive tackle in the National Football League (NFL). He played 31 games for the Green Bay Packers between 1942 and 1944, starting in 23. Berezney was the starting right tackle for the Packers in the 1944 NFL Championship Game. After leaving the NFL in 1944, Berezney played in one game for the Miami Seahawks of the All-America Football Conference (AAFC) in 1946.

== Personal life ==
Born in Jersey City, New Jersey, Berezney attended William L. Dickinson High School. His brother Pete also played in the AAFC.

Their brother Steve wrote a book on their family, titled after their father Pete, called "Sugarhouse Pete: An American Family Story".
