= Tony Nicodemo =

American basketball player

Anthony J. Nicodemo (August 28, 1936 – December 28, 2004) was a college basketball player who set several game, season and career scoring records while playing for Saint Michael's College of Vermont Purple Knights in the late 1950s.

Nicodemo prepped at Ferris High School in Jersey City, New Jersey where he was the first 1,000 point scorer in Jersey City public school history. He was first team All City, All Hudson County, and All State in 1955. His number 13 was the first jersey retired in Jersey City public school history.

Nicodemo was the cornerstone for the foundation of the tremendously successful Saint Michael's College basketball teams of the late 1950s. He was voted a Second Team NCAA Men's Basketball All-American by both the Associated Press ( AP) and United Press international (UPI) in both 1958 and 1959. He was named a Catholic Small College All-American in 1959. He was named All-State three times, and All-New England twice. He was named the Men's College Division NCAA Tournament MVP in the 1958 New England Regionals, as he led the Purple Knights to the national tournament for the third straight year. He was the only small college player named to Look magazine's District One (New England) First Team in 1959. Nicodemo, who set several game, season, and career scoring records at Saint Michael's, also set two NCAA Tournament records in 1958. In the team's win against Grambling, Nicodemo scored 49 points ( NCAA tournament record) on 20 field goals ( NCAA tournament record) to bring the team to the tournament's Final Four. A graduate in the class of 1959, Nicodemo was captain of the basketball team and scored 1,042 points in his collegiate career. Saint Michael's retired his #13 jersey and was inducted as a charter member into the school's hall of fame in 1987. Nicodemo is also an inductee of the Hudson County (NJ) Sports Hall of Fame as well as The New England Basketball Hall of Fame . .
