= Lillian Morrison =

American poet

Lillian Morrison (October 27, 1917 – January 27, 2014) was an American poet, author, and librarian. Morrison was particularly noted for her works aimed at children and featuring sports or athletic endeavors; of her childhood, she remarked, "Mine was a city childhood and our playground was the street. We jumped rope, roller-skated, played almost every kind of ball game….stoop ball, stick ball…"

Morrison was born in Jersey City, New Jersey, the daughter of Russian immigrants. Growing up in the Jersey City Heights neighborhood, Morrison attended William L. Dickinson High School. She graduated from Douglass College in 1938, where she majored in math, and from Columbia University in 1942 where she earned a library science degree. Morrison's collection, now housed at the University of Southern Mississippi, encompasses at least ten books, including such poetry collections as The Sidewalk Racer, and Other Poems of Sports and Motion (1978) and Sprints and Distances; Sports in Poetry and Poetry in Sports (1965).
