= James J. Ferris High School =

High school in Jersey City, New Jersey, United States

Location
- 35 Colgate Street; Jersey City, Hudson County, New Jersey 07302; United States
- Coordinates: 40.720845°N 74.053948°W

Information
- Type: Public high school
- School district: Jersey City Public Schools
- NCES School ID: 340783002774
- Principal: Deneen Alford-Burke
- Faculty: 99.5 FTEs
- Enrollment: 1,364 (as of 2024–25)
- Student to teacher ratio: 13.7:1
- Colors: Green gold and white
- Athletics conference: Hudson County Interscholastic League (general); North Jersey Super Football Conference (football)
- Mascot: Bulldog
- Team name: Bulldogs
- Accreditation: Middle States Association of Colleges and Schools
- Website: jfhs.jcboe.org

James J. Ferris High School is a four-year comprehensive public high school serving students in ninth through twelfth grades from Jersey City in Hudson County, in the U.S. state of New Jersey, operated as part of the Jersey City Public Schools. The school has been accredited by the Middle States Association of Colleges and Schools Commission on Elementary and Secondary Schools since 1940 and is accredited until July 2025.

The school is named for James J. Ferris, a civil engineer and politician in Jersey City best known for supervising the construction of the Pennsylvania Railroad Harsimus Stem Embankment and the concrete foundation of the Hudson and Manhattan Railroad Powerhouse.

As of the 2024–25 school year, the school had an enrollment of 1,364 students and 99.5 classroom teachers (on an FTE basis), for a student–teacher ratio of 13.7:1. There were 936 students (68.6% of enrollment) eligible for free lunch and 48 (3.5% of students) eligible for reduced-cost lunch.

Ferris offers specialized learning centers focusing on Finance, Hospitality & Tourism, Management / Office Procedures, Marketing and International Studies. The magnet offers courses in Accounting, Economics, Banking, Financial Planning, Intro to Finance, Computers Business Applications 1&2. During their senior year, students have an opportunity to take a paid internship co-op program at Merrill Lynch, Hyatt, Pershing, Bank of Tokyo, or the Board of Education.

The school occupies a single building at 35 Colgate Street. The building next to it, former Junior Academy building—previously the Kennedy School annex—has been sold and is now no longer part of Ferris High School. Beginning with the 2025–26 school year, Infinity Institute relocated into that annex building next door, leaving its leased site at 193 Old Bergen Road and becoming a separate magnet school within the Ferris campus area. Ferris has a grass soccer field adjacent to the school that is used for physical activities and home soccer games.

== Awards, recognition and rankings ==
The school was the 299th-ranked public high school in New Jersey out of 339 schools statewide in New Jersey Monthly magazine's September 2014 cover story on the state's "Top Public High Schools", using a new ranking methodology. The school had been ranked 270th in the state of 328 schools in 2012, after being ranked 320th in 2010 out of 322 schools listed. The magazine ranked the school 280th in 2008 out of 316 schools. The school was ranked 284th in the magazine's September 2006 issue, which surveyed 316 schools across the state. Schooldigger.com ranked the school 341st out of 367 public high schools statewide in its 2009-10 rankings which were based on the combined percentage of students classified as proficient or above proficient on the language arts literacy and mathematics components of the High School Proficiency Assessment (HSPA).

Ferris high school also has a program for young girls to become involved with technology and pursue the careers associated with the field.

== Athletics ==
The James J. Ferris High School Bulldogs compete in the Hudson County Interscholastic League, which is comprised of public and private high schools in Hudson County and operates under the supervision of the New Jersey State Interscholastic Athletic Association (NJSIAA). With 1,009 students in grades 10-12, the school was classified by the NJSIAA for the 2019–20 school year as Group III for most athletic competition purposes, which included schools with an enrollment of 761 to 1,058 students in that grade range. The football team competes in the Ivy Red division of the North Jersey Super Football Conference, which includes 112 schools competing in 20 divisions, making it the nation's biggest football-only high school sports league. The football team is one of the 12 programs assigned to the two Ivy divisions starting in 2020, which are intended to allow weaker programs ineligible for playoff participation to compete primarily against each other. The school was classified by the NJSIAA as Group IV North for football for 2024–2026, which included schools with 893 to 1,315 students.

The James J. Ferris High School Bulldogs offers fall sports, winter sports, and spring sports including:

- Fall - Football, Boys Soccer, Girls Soccer, Cross Country, Girls Tennis and Girls Volleyball
- Winter - Boys Basketball, Girls Basketball, Boys Swimming, Girls Swimming, Fencing, Indoor Track and Bowling
- Spring - Outdoor Track, Baseball, Softball, Boys Volleyball and Boys Tennis

The boys' track team won the Group III state indoor relay championships in 1973.

The baseball team won NJSIAA North I Group III sectional titles in 1943, 1947 and 1952. The team won the Hudson County Interscholastic Association League and won the Hudson County Tournament championship with a 5-4 win against Hudson Catholic Regional High School in the finals, ending the program's 69-year wait after most recently winning the title in 1952.

In 1985, Coach Charles Wilkinson led the boys' basketball team to the state Group IV semifinal, falling to Elizabeth High School by a score of 45-44 to end their season.

== Administration ==
The school's principal is Deneen Alford-Burke. The school's core administrative team includes the three vice principals.

== Notable alumni ==
- Robert Ashby (1926–2021, class of 1944), U.S. Army Air Force/U.S. Air Force officer and pilot with the all-African American 332nd Fighter Group – Tuskegee Airmen, who was the first Black pilot for Frontier Airlines
- June Kirby (1928-2022), actress and model
- Warren Loving (born 1960) running back who played in the NFL in 1987 for the Buffalo Bills
- Aaron Manning (born 1961), former defensive back who played in the NFL for the Cincinnati Bengals
- Tony Nicodemo (1936–2004), college basketball player who set several records while playing for Saint Michael's College of Vermont
- Ralph Peduto (1942–2014), film, theater and television actor
- Ray Radziszewski (born 1935), former professional basketball player who played in one game in 1958 for the Philadelphia Warriors
- Michael Angelo Saltarelli (1932-2009), prelate of the Roman Catholic Church who served as Bishop of Wilmington from 1995 to 2008
- Fearon Wright (born 1978), American football linebacker, who played in the National Football League for the Minnesota Vikings
