= June Kirby =

American actress and costume designer (1928–2022)

- Born: January 5, 1928; Brooklyn, New York, U.S.
- Died: March 6, 2022 (aged 94); Aiken, South Carolina U.S.
- Occupation: Actress
- Years active: 1951–1984
- Spouses: Roy Whitlock; Bob Przybysz

June Shirley Kirby (January 5, 1928 – March 6, 2022) was an American actress and model, who spent most of her career as a wardrobe mistress in Hollywood productions' costume departments. She was a showgirl at The Diamond Horseshoe in the late forties and was spotted by Metro-Goldwyn-Mayer which offered her a couple of film parts as a Goldwyn Girl such as in Vincente Minnelli's Kismet (1955) and Joseph L. Mankiewicz's Guys and Dolls (1955) featured opposite Marlon Brando, Larri Thomas and Pat Sheehan. Kirby also performed on Broadway in As the Girls Go (1948–1950), and Gentlemen Prefer Blondes.

== Early years ==
Born in Bay Ridge, Brooklyn, Kirby was raised in Jersey City, New Jersey and earned a diploma at James J. Ferris High School in Jersey City. She later attended Kingston University where she studied fashion.

== Career ==
Kirby worked as a model. In 1946, she was named "posture queen of America" by the National Chiropractic Association. She was in Famous Models Magazine dated June 1950.

In 1955, Kirby worked as the wardrobe mistress for the British science fiction film Timeslip, also known as The Atomic Man. Her role involved overseeing the costume department and ensuring the visual consistency of the characters' attire.

In 1971, she served as the wardrobe mistress for the British comedy film On the Buses, contributing to the costume design and maintenance for the cast.

== Personal life ==
Kirby dated men such as Mickey Rooney. She married Roy B. Whitlock on August 20, 1960, and they had a daughter named Shawn. Whitlock died on December 23, 1984. She later married Bob Przybysz. Kirby died on March 6, 2022, aged 94, in Aiken, South Carolina.

== Filmography ==
=== Actress ===
Year	Title	Director	Role	Notes
1955	Kismet	Vincente Minnelli	Harem lady - Goldwyn Girl	
1955	Guys and Dolls	Joseph L. Mankiewicz	The Hot Box Girls number	The number included Kirby, Pat Sheehan and Larri Thomas.
1955	The Eddie Cantor Comedy Theatre	Eddie Davis	–	Season 1, Episode 26: What Do You Want in a Show.
1957	Highway Patrol	Eddie Davis	Barbara Franklin	Season 2, Episode 18: Statute of Limitations.
1957	The Garment Jungle	Vincent Sherman & Robert Aldrich.	The model	
1957	Silk Stockings	Rouben Mamoulian	Model	
1958	The Last Hurrah	John Ford	Model	
1960	Bells Are Ringing	Vincente Minnelli	Party Guest	

=== Costume designer ===
Year	Title	Director	Notes
1954	The Diamond	Dennis O'Keefe & Montgomery Tully	
1955 - 1956	Fabian of the Yard	Charles Saunders	5 episodes: The Masterpiece; Cocktail Girl; The Ribbon Trap; The Sixth Dagger; The Lover's Knot
1962	Lunch Hour	James Hill	
1972	Along the Way (1972)	T.S. Lyndon-Haynes & John Reeve	

=== Wardrobe department ===
Year	Title	Director	Head of Costume	Notes
1956	The Adventures of the Big Man	Don Chaffey		10 episodes: The Smugglers; The Frightened Angels; The Door of Gold; The Thief; Lady Killer; The Gun Runners; Secret Enemy; The Magenta Box; The Amazon Bandit; The Bomb
1971	On the Buses	Harry Booth	Rosemary Burrows	
1983	The Keep	Michael Mann	Anthony Mendleson	
1984	Supergirl	Jeannot Szwarc	Emma Porteous	

=== Special effects ===
Year	Title	Director	Notes
1982	The Dark Crystal	Jim Henson & Frank Oz	Creatures fabricator for the Mystic Unit
