= Bayard H. Faulkner =

American politician

Bayard Hilton Faulkner

Mayor of Montclair, New Jersey

Personal details
- Born: July 19, 1894; Bucklin, Missouri, U.S.
- Died: November 1983 (aged 89); Montclair, New Jersey, U.S.
- Occupation: Politician, lawyer

Bayard Hilton Faulkner (July 19, 1894 – November 1983) was Mayor of Montclair, New Jersey, and chairman of the 1950 Commission on Municipal Government. The legislation crafted by this commission to update and reform New Jersey's municipal law is commonly called the Faulkner Act, named in his honor.

== Biography ==
He was born on July 19, 1894, in Bucklin, Missouri, to Hilton S. Faulkner and Nellie L. Herreman. After moving in 1900 to Jersey City, New Jersey, with his family, he graduated from William L. Dickinson High School in 1911 and then from New York University.

As chairman of the 1950 Commission on Municipal Government, he was responsible for drafting what became the Optional Municipal Charter Law, which provides New Jersey municipalities with a variety of additional models of local government, beyond the traditional forms (City, Township, Town, Borough and Village), and the two reform-era forms (Walsh Act and the 1923 Municipal Manager Law).

He died in November 1983. Faulkner was buried in Mount Hebron Cemetery, Montclair, New Jersey.
