= Dom Flora =

American basketball player (1935–2021)

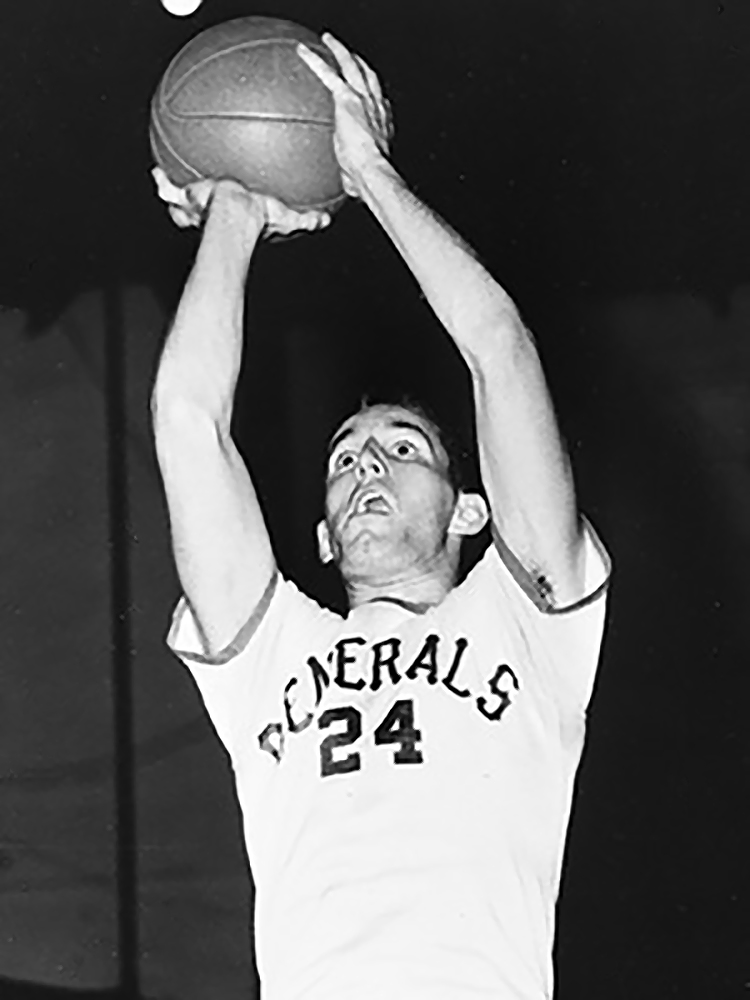

Personal information
- Born: December 12, 1935 Jersey City, New Jersey, U.S.
- Died: July 5, 2021 (aged 85) Egg Harbor Township, New Jersey, U.S.
- Listed height: 6 ft 2 in (1.88 m)

Career information
- High school: William L. Dickinson (Jersey City, New Jersey)
- College: Washington and Lee (1954–1958)
- NBA draft: 1958: 4th round, 31st overall pick
- Drafted by: Boston Celtics
- Position: Point guard
- Number: 44, 45

Career highlights
- SoCon Player of the Year (1958); AP honorable mention All-American (1958); 2× First-team All-SoCon (1957, 1958)
- Stats at Basketball Reference

Dominick Anthony Flora (June 12, 1935 – July 5, 2021) was an All-American college basketball standout at Washington and Lee University (W&L), located in Lexington, Virginia. Flora played for the W&L Generals from 1954–55 to 1957–58. Dom Flora was a native of Jersey City, New Jersey and played high school football, baseball, and basketball for William L. Dickinson High School.

A point guard, Flora was an explosive scorer whose accurate jump shot and crisp ball-handling ability helped him average 21 points per game for his career. He was able to score despite being double– and triple–teamed by opposing defenses, and his aggressive style of play led him to become one of the most prolific free throw shooters in NCAA Division I history. As of the conclusion of the 2011–12 season, Flora's 696 free throws made are still in the top 25 all-time in Division I history. He shot 696-for-954 (73.0%) in 109 career games played.

As a senior in 1957–58, Flora was named the Southern Conference Player of the Year, the Virginia Big Six Player of the Year, and a First Team All-America selection by the Helms Foundation that also included NBA all-time legends Wilt Chamberlain, Oscar Robertson, and Elgin Baylor. He also earned his second straight First Team All-Southern Conference selection. When his career ended, Flora finished with 2,310 points, which at the time was the fifth–highest total in NCAA history.

Dom was also a standout on the baseball diamond playing baseball all four years while at W&L after turning down a contract from the New York Giants (baseball) MLB team.

Dom was drafted by the Boston Celtics in the 1958 NBA draft (31st overall pick). That team already had Bob Cousy, Bill Russell, Bill Sharman, and Tom Heinsohn (and would go on to win the NBA championship in 1959). Dom was traded after the pre-season camp to The Akron Goodyear Wingfoots as part of the prestigious National Industrial Basketball League in Akron, OH from 1958 to 1960.

He eventually moved from playing into the front office including being a Sales and Marketing Executive for the Portland Thunder of the World Football League, Director of Marketing for the New York Cosmos in the North American Soccer League (including the 1977 championship team led by soccer superstar Pelé), as well as General Manager for the Cleveland Force of the National Indoor Soccer League.

Bill Brill, a sports writer for The Roanoke Times & World News, once wrote about Flora:

“Flora left the fans gasping with one bit of razzle-dazzle, on which he dribbled with his left hand, jumped into the air, switched the ball behind his back to his right hand, and made a jump shot. It was worth the price of admission.”
