= Pete Berezney =

American football player (1923–2008)

No. 40, 49, 47
- Position: Tackle

Personal information
- Born: November 14, 1923; Jersey City, New Jersey, U.S.
- Died: October 13, 2008 (aged 84); Olean, New York, U.S.
- Listed height: 6 ft 2 in (1.88 m)
- Listed weight: 240 lb (109 kg)

Career information
- High school: Dickinson (Jersey City)
- College: Notre Dame (1943–1945)
- NFL draft: 1946: 7th round, 58th overall pick

Career history
- Los Angeles Dons (1947); Baltimore Colts (1948)

Awards and highlights
- National champion (1943)

Career AAFC statistics
- Games played: 25
- Games started: 3
- Stats at Pro Football Reference

Peter John Berezney Jr. (November 14, 1923 – October 13, 2008) was an American professional football tackle who played two seasons in the All-America Football Conference (AAFC) with the Los Angeles Dons and Baltimore Colts. He was drafted by the Detroit Lions in the seventh round of the 1946 NFL draft. He played college football at the University of Notre Dame.

== Early life and college ==
Peter John Berezney Jr. was born on November 14, 1923, in Jersey City, New Jersey. He attended William L. Dickinson High School in Jersey City.

Berezney played for he Notre Dame Fighting Irish from 1943 to 1945. He was a starter his senior year in 1945. The 1943 Fighting Irish were national champions.

== Professional career ==
Berezney was selected by the Detroit Lions in the seventh round, with the 58th overall pick, of the 1946 NFL draft. He played in twelve games, starting three, for the Los Angeles Dons in 1947. He played in thirteen games for the Baltimore Colts during the 1948 season.

== Personal life ==
Berezney's brother Paul played in the National Football League and AAFC. Pete's brother Steve wrote a book on their family, titled after their father Pete, called "Sugarhouse Pete: An American Family Story".

Berezney died on October 13, 2008, in Olean, New York.
