= Ella Barksdale Brown =

American activist (1871–1966)

- Born: June 22, 1871; Milledgeville, Georgia, U.S.
- Died: November 7, 1966 (aged 95); Jersey City, New Jersey, U.S.
- Education: Spelman College
- Known for: African-American anti-lynching advocate, activist, educator, suffragette and journalist

Ella Barksdale Brown (June 22, 1871 – November 7, 1966) was an American anti-lynching advocate, activist, educator, suffragette and journalist. She was a member of the first graduating class of Spelman College in Atlanta, Georgia.

== Life ==
On June 22, 1871, in Milledgeville, Georgia, Ella Barksdale was born to Jefferson and Julia Lamar Barksdale, both former slaves. She attended college and was a student in the first graduating class from Spelman College in Atlanta, Georgia. After marrying John M. Brown in Georgia in 1898, she moved to Jersey City, New Jersey in 1901. John found a job there working for the Pullman Company. Together, Ella and John had four children: Marcia, Jefferson Barksdale, Mildred, and Miriam.

== Work ==
Brown was a journalist who wrote for The Chicago Defender and The New York Amsterdam News and was also a columnist for the Jersey Journal.

Besides writing, she was a well-known educator within the Jersey City high schools and surrounding community. She was given credit for introducing African-American studies into Jersey City public schools. The area schools and community organizations hosted her lectures on African American history due to her dedication to education. She was the first woman to be appointed to the Hudson County Board of Election.

Brown was most involved with the National Association for the Advancement of Colored People (NAACP), the Circle For Negro War Relief, the New Jersey Civil Rights Bureau, and the National Association of Colored Women. Her involvement in these organizations gained her recognition in community and national activist circles, which gained her personal connections with many leading civil rights and African American leaders including W.E.B. Dubois, Booker T. Washington, Paul Robeson, and James Weldon Johnson.

Along with her journalistic and educational achievements, Brown is credited with advocating for the New Jersey Federation to designate March 5 as Crispus Attucks day in New Jersey, which they did in 1949. She died in Jersey City in 1966, aged 95.
