= William DeNoble =

William DeNoble (July 3, 1924 – October 3, 2007) was an American trade unionist.

A lifelong resident of Jersey City, New Jersey, William DeNoble went to work as a longshoreman at the age of 18. He married at the age of 20 and became the night tractor boss on the Jersey City piers at the age of 24. At 26 he became hiring boss on pier "F" in Jersey City. He was the youngest in that job in the history of the East Coast International Longshoremen's Association.

At 29 years of age he became the state organizer of the International Longshoreman's Association, a member of the AFL. He then went on to become a personal aide to Captain William V. Bradley, President of the ILA. He was also a labor consultant to Congressman Vincent J. Dellay and Dominick V. Daniels and a legislative aide to Assemblyman Anthony Impervuduto. William DeNoble then ran for City Council in Jersey City as a candidate under Mayor Thomas Gangemi. He also ran for mayor in Jersey City unsuccessfully in 1980.

DeNoble became supervisor of Hudson County Parks which he maintained until his retirement. He was a Parking Authority commissioner in Jersey City for seven years and briefly ran the Parking Authority for a period of six months. He was also President of the Holy Name Society of Hudson County and on numerous Boards.

DeNoble headed his own William DeNoble Association for many years in downtown Jersey City. He sponsored many benefits for handicapped children and for individual families in need. He served in the United States Coast Guard and was discharged with an honorable discharge.
