= Bernice Pauahi Fernow =

American painter (1881–1969)

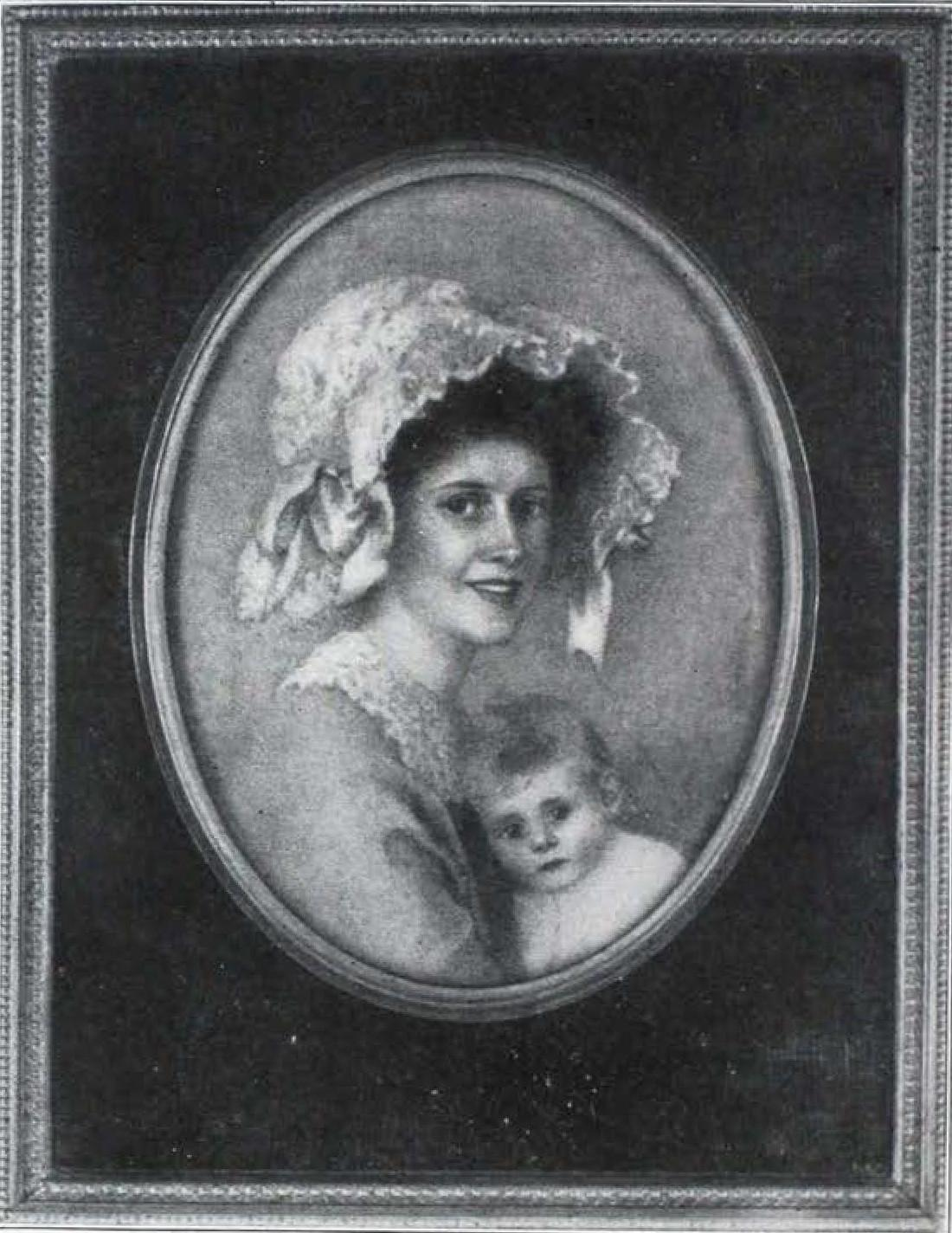
- self-portrait by Bernice Pauahi Andrews Fernow
- Born: Bernice Pauahi Andrews; December 17, 1881; Jersey City
- Died: April 20, 1969 (aged 87); Wilmington
- Alma mater: Cornell University
- Occupation: Artist

Bernice Pauahi Fernow (née Andrews; December 17, 1881 – April 20, 1969) was an American miniature painter.

== Early life and education ==
Bernice Pauahi Andrews was born on December 17, 1881 in Jersey City, New Jersey. Her father, William Andrews, was an engineer born in Hawaii, the son of missionary Lorrin Andrews. Her mother, Adele Oscanyan, was born in Constantinople, the daughter of Armenian writer and Turkish diplomat Christopher Oscanyan. She was named after Bernice Pauahi Bishop, a childhood classmate of her father, presumably at the Royal School.

She attended Girls' High School in Brooklyn and Cornell University, graduating in 1904. At Cornell, she met her husband, engineer Bernhard Edward Fernow Jr., the son of forester Bernhard Fernow. They married in 1908 and lived in Milwaukee, Wisconsin and Clemson, South Carolina, where her husband was head of the mechanical engineering department at Clemson College.

== Painting career ==
In 1903, she joined the Art Students' League and studied with Theodora W. Thayer, H. Siddons Mowbray, Frank Vincent DuMond, John Henry Twachtman, and Irving R. Wiles.

She exhibited her work widely, including at the International Exhibition of Art in Rome, the Panama–Pacific International Exposition in San Francisco, and a solo exhibition at Cornell University in 1924. A watercolor on ivory miniature of her daughter Ethel is in the collection of the Metropolitan Museum of Art.

== Death ==
Fernow eventually settled in Wilmington, Delaware, where she died on April 20, 1969, aged 87.
