= Louisiana Board of Elementary and Secondary Education =

Government agency of Louisiana, United States

The Louisiana Board of Elementary and Secondary Education (BESE) is an administrative policy-making body established by the Constitution of Louisiana with responsibility for elementary and secondary schools in the state of Louisiana. The Board consists of eight elected and three appointed members, and is responsible for selecting the State Superintendent of Education.

== History ==
The 1921 Constitution established the State Board of Education as a constitutional entity, which originally had eight members from the state's congressional districts, who were elected to eight-year terms, and three members from the state's Railroad Commission districts, who were appointed by the Governor to four-year terms. The Board originally had the responsibility of appointing the state's Superintendent of Public Education, which had been an elected office before that point. However, in 1922, the legislature proposed a constitutional amendment that continued the elected Superintendent, which the voters ratified. In 1946, voters ratified another constitutional amendment that eliminated the Governor's power to appoint members to the Board, instead providing that the members from the Commission districts would be elected.

In the 1974 Constitution, the education article was entirely rewritten. The State Board of Education was reorganized as the Board of Elementary and Secondary Education, with eight members elected from congressional districts and three gubernatorially appointed members. The constitution continued the elected Superintendent, but allowed the legislature to abolish the office by a two-thirds vote, which it did in 1985. Following the 1990 United States census, which saw Louisiana lose a congressional district, the state legislature drew separate districts for the Board that were no longer based on congressional districts.

== Responsibilities ==
The Louisiana State Board of Elementary and Secondary Education (BESE) oversees public elementary and secondary education in the state, including schools in the Special School District, which serves students in correctional and mental health facilities. The board's responsibilities include adopting the Minimum Foundation Program (MFP) formula for school funding, enacting policies for public and private schools, and overseeing the Louisiana Department of Education’s planning functions. BESE also sets certification requirements for teachers and administrators, approves teacher education programs, and establishes guidelines for alternative education programs. Additionally, the board authorizes certain types of charter schools, monitors financially at-risk school districts, and administers federal and state education funds, including the 8(g) Education Quality Trust Fund. The board also manages student performance assessments, school accountability measures, and nonpublic school approvals while coordinating educational programs within Louisiana’s correctional institutions and mental health facilities. BESE appoints the Louisiana Superintendent of Education, who is tasked by the Louisiana Constitution with "implement[ing] the policies of the State Board of Elementary and Secondary Education and the laws affecting schools under its jurisdiction."

== Membership ==
The BESE consists of eleven total members: eight members elected from BESE districts drawn by the state legislature, and three at-large members appointed by the Governor. The elected members are elected at gubernatorial elections to four-year terms, with special elections scheduled if a vacancy occurs in the interim. The appointed members are appointed by each Governor at the start of their term with the advice and consent of the Louisiana State Senate. In 2008, Louisiana voters imposed term limits on BESE members, limiting both elected and appointed members to no more than two and a half consecutive terms in office.

== Current membership ==
=== Elected Members ===
Louisiana Board of Elementary and Secondary Education Members
District	Name	Start	Party	Next Election
1	Joseph Cao	January 14, 2026 (appointed)	Republican	2026 (special)
2	Sharon Latten Clark, Secretary-Treasurer	January 8, 2024	Democratic	2027
3	Sandy Holloway	January 11, 2016	Republican	2027 (term limited)
4	Stacey Melerine	January 8, 2024	Republican	2027
5	Lance Harris	January 8, 2024	Republican	2027
6	Ronnie Morris	January 13, 2020	Republican	2027
7	Kevin Berken, Vice President	January 8, 2024	Republican	2027
8	Preston Castille	January 13, 2020	Democratic	2027

=== Appointed Members ===
Name	Start	Party	Term End
Conrad Appel	January 8, 2024	Republican	2028
Judy Armstrong	January 8, 2024	Republican	2028
Simone Champagne, President	January 8, 2024	Republican	2028

== See also ==
- Louisiana Department of Education
