= Mayor of Montclair, New Jersey =

Political office in New Jersey, US

Mayors of Montclair, New Jersey (not all mayors listed):

- David Doremus Duncan, 1904 to 1907.
- Henry V. Crawford, c. 1907.
- Ernest C. Hinck, c. 1911.
- Louis F. Dodd, c. 1914.
- Howard F. McConnell, (1873-1933) 1920 to 1924.
- Bayard H. Faulkner, (1894–1983) c. 1950.
- Harold S. Osborne, 1961 to 1964.
- Harold Hayes, c. 1966.
- Matthew G. Carter, 1968 to 1972. First black mayor of Montclair.
- Peter Bonastia, 1972-1976.
- Grant Gille, 1976 to 1980. Gille was the last mayor to serve in Montclair under its commission form of government before the township reconfigured to the Township Council/Township Manager model.
- Mary V. Mochary (born 1942), 1980 to 1984.
- James Ramsey, 1984 to 1986.
- Laurence H. Olive, 1986 to 1987.
- Robert D. Jackson, 1987 to 1988.
- Clifford Lindholm II, 1988 to 1992. Per a change in Montclair's charter, Lindholm was the first mayor of Montclair under the Council-Manager system to be elected directly by the people rather than Council.
- James Bishop, 1992 to 1996.
- William Farlie, 1996 to 2000.
- Robert J. Russo, 2000 to 2004.
- Ed Remsen, 2004 to 2008.
- Jerry Fried, 2008 to 2012.
- Robert D. Jackson, 2012 to 2020. Jackson is the only mayor under the Council-Manager system to be elected by both the council and people; as of July 1, 2024, he is the only mayor under the Council-Manager system to serve two full four-year terms, and only mayor under the Council-Manager system to serve non-consecutive terms.
- Sean M. Spiller, 2020 to 2024.
- Renée E. Baskerville, July 1, 2024 to present.
