= North Jersey Tri-County Conference =

The North Jersey Tri-County Conference was a high school athletic conference in New Jersey, created by the New Jersey State Interscholastic Athletic Association (NJSIAA) as a holding conference. The NJTCC consisted of 45 public and non-public schools in Bergen, Passaic and Hudson counties, and existed for the 2009–2010 academic year.

The North Jersey Tri-County Conference should not be confused with the Tri-County Conference, located in Camden, Cape May, Cumberland, Gloucester and Salem counties, which was first established in 1928 and continues in existence today.

== History ==
As high school athletics in New Jersey grew in the 1990s and 2000s, problems began to develop in the organization of leagues and conferences. Transportation costs began to grow, as some conferences had teams from as many as four different counties competing against each other. Other conferences were losing competitive balance, as a growth in non-public school enrollment and athletic programs caused tension between non-public and public schools, with public schools accusing non-public schools of recruiting. Conferences also demanded more flexibility in scheduling, as schools felt locked into league and division schedules against opponents either too weak or too strong for true competitive balance.

The strongest tensions were found in the Northern New Jersey Interscholastic League, where public schools, who were frustrated by the competitive imbalance with non-public schools, especially Don Bosco Preparatory (Ramsey) and Bergen Catholic (Oradell) in football or Immaculate Heart Academy (Township of Washington) in girls' athletics, threatened to secede from the league.

Therefore, in 2008 the NJSIAA established a "Leagues and Conferences Realignment Committee" to discuss the need for realigning conferences and leagues throughout New Jersey. Their original proposal for schools in northern New Jersey was the creation of six super conferences from the eleven conferences then in existence. While the original proposal was not accepted as presented, it was adjusted and schools realigned yet again, to create the current system in place in New Jersey athletics.

The North Jersey Tri-County Conference served as a mega conference during the one-year transition period (2009-2010) before statewide realignment, and in many ways was simply a clearinghouse for logistical and competitive balance while the NJSIAA and its member schools continued to debate the realignment process. It incorporated teams from the Northern New Jersey Interscholastic League, Northern Hills Conference, North Bergen Interscholastic Athletic League and the Hudson County Interscholastic Athletic Association, which went on hiatus during the 2009–2010 season.

When realignment was agreed to, the NJTCC was disbanded in favor of its successor conferences, the Big North Conference, the North Jersey Interscholastic Conference and the reconstituted Hudson County Interscholastic Athletic Association.

== Former Member Schools ==
=== Bergen County Public Schools ===
- Bergen County Technical High School - Hackensack
- Fair Lawn High School - Fair Lawn
- Hackensack High School - Hackensack
- Paramus High School - Paramus
- Ridgewood High School - Ridgewood
- Teaneck High School – Teaneck

=== Bergen County Non-Public Schools ===
- Bergen Catholic High School - Oradell
- Don Bosco Preparatory High School - Ramsey
- Immaculate Heart Academy - Washington Township, New Jersey
- Saint Joseph Regional High School - Montvale

=== Passaic County Public Schools ===
- Clifton High School - Clifton
- Eastside High School - Paterson
- John F. Kennedy High School - Paterson
- Lakeland Regional High School - Wanaque
- Passaic County Technical Institute - Wayne
- Passaic High School - Passaic
- Passaic Valley High School - Little Falls
- Wayne Hills High School – Wayne
- Wayne Valley High School - Wayne
- West Milford High School - West Milford

=== Passaic County Non-Public Schools ===
- DePaul Catholic High School - Wayne

=== Hudson County Public Schools ===
- Bayonne High School - Bayonne
- Create Charter High School - Jersey City (closed in 2010)
- Dr. Ronald E. McNair Academic High School - Jersey City
- Ferris High School - Jersey City
- High Tech High School - North Bergen
- Hoboken High School - Hoboken
- County Prep High School - Jersey City
- Kearny High School - Kearny
- Lincoln High School - Jersey City
- Memorial High School - West New York
- North Bergen High School - North Bergen
- Snyder High School - Jersey City
- Union City High School - Union City
- University Academy Charter High School – Jersey City
- William L. Dickinson High School - Jersey City

=== Hudson County Non-Public Schools ===
- Holy Family Academy - Bayonne
- Hudson Catholic Regional High School - Jersey City
- Kearny Christian Academy - Kearny
- Marist High School - Bayonne
- Saint Anthony High School - Jersey City
- Saint Dominic Academy - Jersey City
- Saint Mary High School - Jersey City
- Saint Peter's Preparatory High School - Jersey City

== Sports Offered ==
=== Fall Sports ===
- Cross Country
- Field Hockey
- Football
- Gymnastics
- Soccer
- Tennis (Girls)
- Volleyball (Girls)

=== Winter Sports ===
- Basketball (Boys)
- Basketball (Girls)
- Bowling
- Ice Hockey
- Swimming
- Winter Track
- Wrestling

=== Spring Sports ===
- Baseball
- Golf
- Lacrosse
- Softball
- Tennis (Boys)
- Track & Field
- Volleyball (Boys)
