= Innovation High School =

High school in Jersey City, New Jersey, United States

Location
- 239 Bergen Avenue; Jersey City, Hudson County, New Jersey 07305; United States
- 40.7105038°N 74.0847252°W

Information
- Type: Public high school
- Established: September 2014
- School district: Jersey City Public Schools
- NCES School ID: 340783003378
- Principal: Emilio Pane
- Faculty: NA
- Grades: 9-12
- Enrollment: 286 (as of 2023–24)
- Student to teacher ratio: NA
- Color: Forest Green
- Website: ihs.jcboe.org

The Innovation High School is a four-year comprehensive and college preparatory public high school in Jersey City in Hudson County, in the U.S. state of New Jersey, operated as part of the Jersey City Public Schools. It is one of a number of high school programs serving students in ninth through twelfth grades offered by the school district.

As of the 2023–24 school year, the school had an enrollment of 286 students. There were 154 students (53.8% of enrollment) eligible for free lunch and 8 (2.8% of students) eligible for reduced-cost lunch.

== History ==
The school, focused on education in STEAM fields, opened with an enrollment of 100 ninth graders in September 2014 as a school-within-a-school at Henry Snyder High School, with the support of the Institute for Student Achievement and New Jersey City University.

== Administration ==
The school's principal is Emilio Pane.

== Notable alumni ==
- Cheickna Traore (born 2000), sprinter who is the Ivorian national record holder in the 200 metres
