= New Jersey State Normal School =

New Jersey State Normal School may refer to one of six public college and universities:

- The College of New Jersey (TCNJ), founded 1855; named New Jersey State Normal School 1855–1908; subsequently named New Jersey State Normal School in Trenton 1908–1929; New Jersey State Teachers College and State Normal School at Trenton from 1929-1937; New Jersey State Teachers College at Trenton 1937-1958; Trenton State College (TSC) 1958-1996.
- Kean University, founded 1855; Newark Normal School 1855-1913; subsequently named New Jersey State Normal School at Newark 1913–1937; New Jersey State Teachers College 1937–1959; Newark State College 1959–1973; Kean College of New Jersey 1973–1997.
- William Paterson University, founded 1855; named Patterson City Normal School 1855-1923; subsequently named New Jersey State Normal School at Paterson 1923–1937; New Jersey State Teacher’s College at Paterson 1937–1951; Paterson State Teachers College 1951–1958; Paterson State College 1958–1971; William Paterson College of New Jersey 1971–1997.
- Montclair State University, founded 1908; named New Jersey State Normal School at Montclair 1908–1927; subsequently named Montclair State Teachers College 1927–1958; Newark Normal School of Physical Education and Hygiene 1917–1928; Panzer College of Physical Education and Hygiene 1928–1958; Montclair State College 1958–1994.
- Rowan University, founded 1923; named Glassboro Normal School 1923; subsequently named Glassboro State College 1958-1992; Rowan College of New Jersey 1992-1997.
- New Jersey City University (NJCU), founded 1927; named New Jersey State Normal School at Jersey City 1927–1935; subsequently named New Jersey State Teachers College at Jersey City 1935–1958; Jersey City State College 1958–1998.
