= Infinity Institute =

High school in Hudson County, New Jersey, US

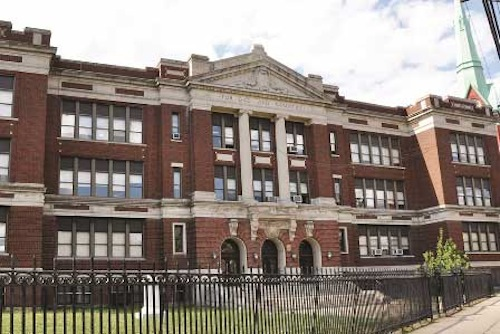
- Former Infinity Institute building

Location
- 35 Colgate Street; Jersey City, Hudson County, New Jersey 07302; United States; 40.721373°N 74.052588°W

Information
- Former name: CREATE Charter High School (closed 2009-10)
- Type: Public middle school / high school
- Motto: Where Learning Never Ends!
- Established: 2010
- School district: Jersey City Public Schools
- NCES School ID: 340783003121
- Principal: Treniere Dobson
- Faculty: 24.0 FTEs
- Grades: 6 - 12
- Enrollment: 265 (as of 2024–25)
- Student to teacher ratio: 11.0:1
- Colors: Black; White
- Team name: Phoenixes
- Publication: The Old Bergen Times
- Website: ii.jcboe.org

Infinity Institute is a public middle school / high school located in Downtown,Jersey City, in Hudson County, in the U.S. state of New Jersey, serving students in sixth through twelfth grades as part of the Jersey City Public Schools. While it is a public school, students have to apply for admission. Applications must have multiple letters of recommendation, as well as impressive grades from the previous academic year. Middle school applicants take the Otis–Lennon School Ability Test, while high school applicants take the PSAT 8/9. About hundred applicants are accepted for sixth grade, while around fifty are accepted to the ninth grade. Approximately 10% of applicants that apply to grades six through twelve are accepted. The school consistently ranks in the top 5% in New Jersey academically. The school was established in September 2010 under the Jersey City Board of Education.

As of the 2024–25 school year, the school had an enrollment of 265 students and 24.0 classroom teachers (on an FTE basis), for a student–teacher ratio of 11.0:1. There were 132 students (49.8% of enrollment) eligible for free lunch and 9 (3.4% of students) eligible for reduced-cost lunch.

== History ==
The school opened in September 2010, offering a magnet college preparatory program with admission based on an admission exam. The school was located in a building that had been leased from the Roman Catholic Archdiocese of Newark and that had been the previous home of the Create Charter High School, which lost its charter after the 2009-10 school year.

Beginning with the 2025–2026 school year, Infinity Institute moved from its former location at 193 Old Bergen Road to the renovated Kennedy School building next to Ferris High School in Downtown Jersey City. The new facility provides upgraded amenities such as a gym, cafeteria, and climate control, and now serves as the school’s permanent site.

== Standards ==
General admittance is based on a consensus of PSAT 8/9 scores, academic performance from the 6th through 8th grades, extracurricular activities, and teacher recommendations. With the primary goal of diversity through affirmative action, the school's enrollment is based on a quota of 25% White, 25% Black, 25% Hispanic, and 25% Other (mostly Asian).

Students are also required to fulfill 25 hours of mandatory community in order to graduate in 12th grade. They must also maintain a final grade of 70 or higher on all of their courses. If a student has a failing final grade in one course, they must go to summer school in order to pass the course. If a student receives a failing final grade in two or more courses, he or she cannot re-enroll in the school the following school year, and must instead attend his or her local public or private high school.

== School uniforms ==
According to the JCBOE, male students in Infinity must wear a long or short-sleeve black or white uniform with the mascot; along with khakis or black pants. For girls, they wear the same uniform as the boys do, but they have a choice of pants or skirts. Both also must wear a black or white sweater during cooler months. Must wear school’s uniform shirt (black or white) with school logo daily. • Bottoms (pants, skirts) must be black, tan or khaki-colored, and must not be skin-tight or ripped. • Jeans, sweatpants, leggings, stretch pants or athletic gear are not allowed. Athletic gear and sweatpants are permitted for Physical Education classes (not hallways). We do sell Infinity athletic wear if interested. • Sneakers and shoes with laces must be secured at all times. No sandals, flip flops, slippers, opentoed or backless slip on shoes can be worn. • Hoods on sweatshirts and sweat bands are not permitted unless for religious, medical or cultural purposes. • Sweaters or zip sweat jackets must be black or white. School shirt must be worn underneath sweater or sweatshirt. • Students can be issued Saturday Detention for repeated Dress Code violations.

== Awards, recognition and rankings ==
Prior to 2018, Infinity Institute was ranked 46th within New Jersey according to US News, with a College Readiness score of 35.5/100.0. The AP® participation rate at Infinity Institute is 68 percent, and the total minority enrollment was 80 percent.

In 2018, Infinity Institute was ranked #1595 in the National Rankings and earned a silver medal. In Niche, Infinity was ranked #90 in the Niche Standout High Schools in America and #2 in the Niche Standout High Schools in New Jersey and Hudson County, along with an overall grade of an A minus. About 96% of the students are proficient in reading, and 82% are proficient in mathematics. SchoolDigger ranks Infinity Institute 9th of 712 New Jersey public middle schools, and 17th of 712 New Jersey public high schools.

The school was honored by the National Blue Ribbon Schools Program in 2019, one of nine schools in the state recognized as Exemplary High Performing Schools.

In 2021, according to U.S. News & World Report, Infinity Institute is ranked as #11 in New Jersey and #182 nationally.

As of the 2025-2026 school year, U.S. News & World Report ranked Infinity Institute as the #1 middle school in New Jersey amongst public, charter, and private schools in the state.

== Academics ==
From grades 6-12, some of Infinity Institute's academic programs taught are:

- Mathematics (Grades 6-8)
- Algebra I and II (Grades 9 and 11)
- Geometry (Grade 10)
- Precalculus (Grade 12)
- English Language Arts (Grades 6-12)
- Science (Grades 6-12)
- Social Studies
- Health (Grades 6-12)
- Science (Biology, Chemistry & Physics) (Grades 6-12)

For grades 9-12, Honors and AP classes are also included.

== Specials ==
Some specials are also used during period time, such as:

- Physical Education (Gym)
- Spanish (Grades 6-12)
- Italian (Grades 6-12)
- Mandarin (Grades 6-12)
- Visual Arts
- Music Arts
- Technology

== YMCA ==
YMCA was introduced during the 2010-11 school year for Infinity Institute. Like the C.A.S.P.E.R. program, YMCA is an after-school program starting from 3:00-6:00 PM from Monday through Friday. YMCA of Infinity Institute is the most populated after-school program. YMCA is known for its activities, athletics and other programs. YMCA also provides school lunch and/or dinner for the students.

== Administration ==
The school's principal is Treniere Dobson. The core administration team includes the vice principal.
