= New Jersey State Teachers College =

New Jersey State Teachers College may refer to one of three public universities:

- The College of New Jersey, known as the New Jersey State Teachers College and State Normal School at Trenton 1929–1937 and the New Jersey State Teachers College at Trenton 1937–1958
- Kean University, named New Jersey State Teachers College at Newark 1937–1959
- New Jersey City University, named New Jersey State Teachers College at Jersey City 1935–1958
