= Liberty High School (New Jersey) =

High school in Hudson County, New Jersey, US

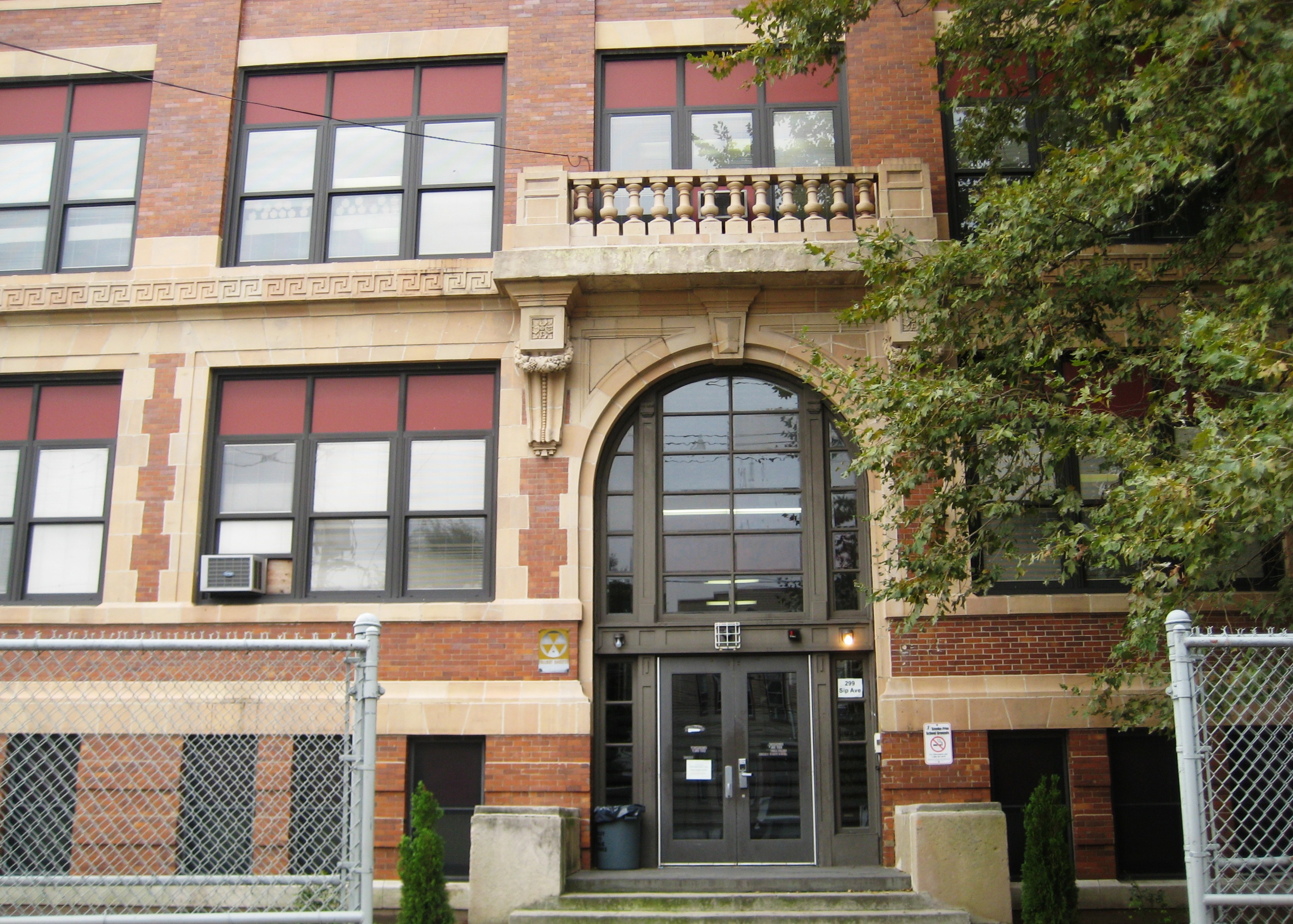

Location
- 299 Sip Avenue; Jersey City, Hudson County, New Jersey 07306; United States; 40.732841°N 74.074039°W

Information
- Type: Public high school
- Motto: Soar to Succeed
- Established: 1999
- School district: Jersey City Public Schools
- NCES School ID: 340783000391
- Principal: Monica Grazilla
- Faculty: 25.0 FTEs
- Grades: 9 - 12
- Enrollment: 193 (as of 2024–25)
- Student to teacher ratio: 7.7:1
- Colors: Red; White and Blue
- Team name: Eagles
- Website: lhs.jcboe.org

Liberty High School is a four-year public high school located in Jersey City, in Hudson County, in the U.S. state of New Jersey, serving students in ninth through twelfth grades as part of the Jersey City Public Schools. The school was established in September 1999 as a partnership between the Jersey City Board of Education and Hudson County Community College.

As of the 2024–25 school year, the school had an enrollment of 193 students and 25.0 classroom teachers (on an FTE basis), for a student–teacher ratio of 7.7:1. There were 116 students (60.1% of enrollment) eligible for free lunch and 17 (8.8% of students) eligible for reduced-cost lunch.

== History ==
The school was created in 1999 with the cooperation of the Jersey City school district and Hudson County Community College as a "middle college" program that would give students the skills they need to succeed in college, while allowing students to earn 24 college credits during their time in high school. The school accepted an initial ninth-grade class of 50 students, who were accepted randomly from a group of 250 applicants who met the admission criteria, with plans to accept 50 incoming students each year and a student body of 200 in grades 9-12.

== Awards, recognition and rankings ==
The school was the 268th-ranked public high school in New Jersey out of 339 schools statewide in New Jersey Monthly magazine's September 2014 cover story on the state's "Top Public High Schools", using a new ranking methodology. The school had been ranked 186th in the state of 328 schools in 2012, after being ranked 163rd in 2010 out of 322 schools listed. The magazine ranked the school 245th in 2008 out of 316 schools. The school was ranked 249th in the magazine's September 2006 issue, which surveyed 316 schools across the state. Schooldigger.com ranked the school 273rd out of 367 public high schools statewide in its 2009-10 rankings which were based on the combined percentage of students classified as proficient or above proficient on the language arts literacy and mathematics components of the High School Proficiency Assessment (HSPA).
