= Create Charter High School =

Coordinates: 40.6963°N 74.0940°W

- United States

Information
- Type: Four-year public high school
- Established: September 2001
- Closed: June 2010

CREATE Charter High School was a four-year public high school that operated under a charter granted by the New Jersey Commissioner of Education. The school was run independently of the Jersey City Public Schools since it opened in September 2001 and was shut down in June 2010 after receiving notice from Acting Commissioner of Education Bret Schundler that the charter would be withdrawn as the school had failed to achieve its goals, including having less than 5% of graduating seniors reaching the proficient level on the language arts and mathematics components of the High School Proficiency Assessment.

CREATE Charter High School was a public school open to all students on a space-available basis. The school also had a middle school, CREATE Charter Middle School, and was the only high school in the county to do so. Offering a 195-day school year with a school day extending from 8:30 am to 3:30 pm, the school was founded by Jersey City Councilman Steve Lipski.

== Athletics ==
CREATE competed in the Hudson County Interscholastic Athletic Association, which included private and parochial high schools in Hudson County and operates under the supervision of the New Jersey State Interscholastic Athletic Association (NJSIAA). In June 2009, the NJSIAA suspended Create Charter from participating in interscholastic sports, citing incidents in which the school had allowed a student who had been charged in an armed robbery sit on the bench during a basketball game and advertisements placed in local papers that promoted a new football program and solicited potential recruits with the offer of being able to join the team and play immediately.

The boys' basketball team won the Central, Group I state sectional championship with an 82–65 win over Asbury Park High School in the tournament final in 2007.
