= Dr. Ronald E. McNair Academic High School =

High school in Jersey City, New Jersey, United States

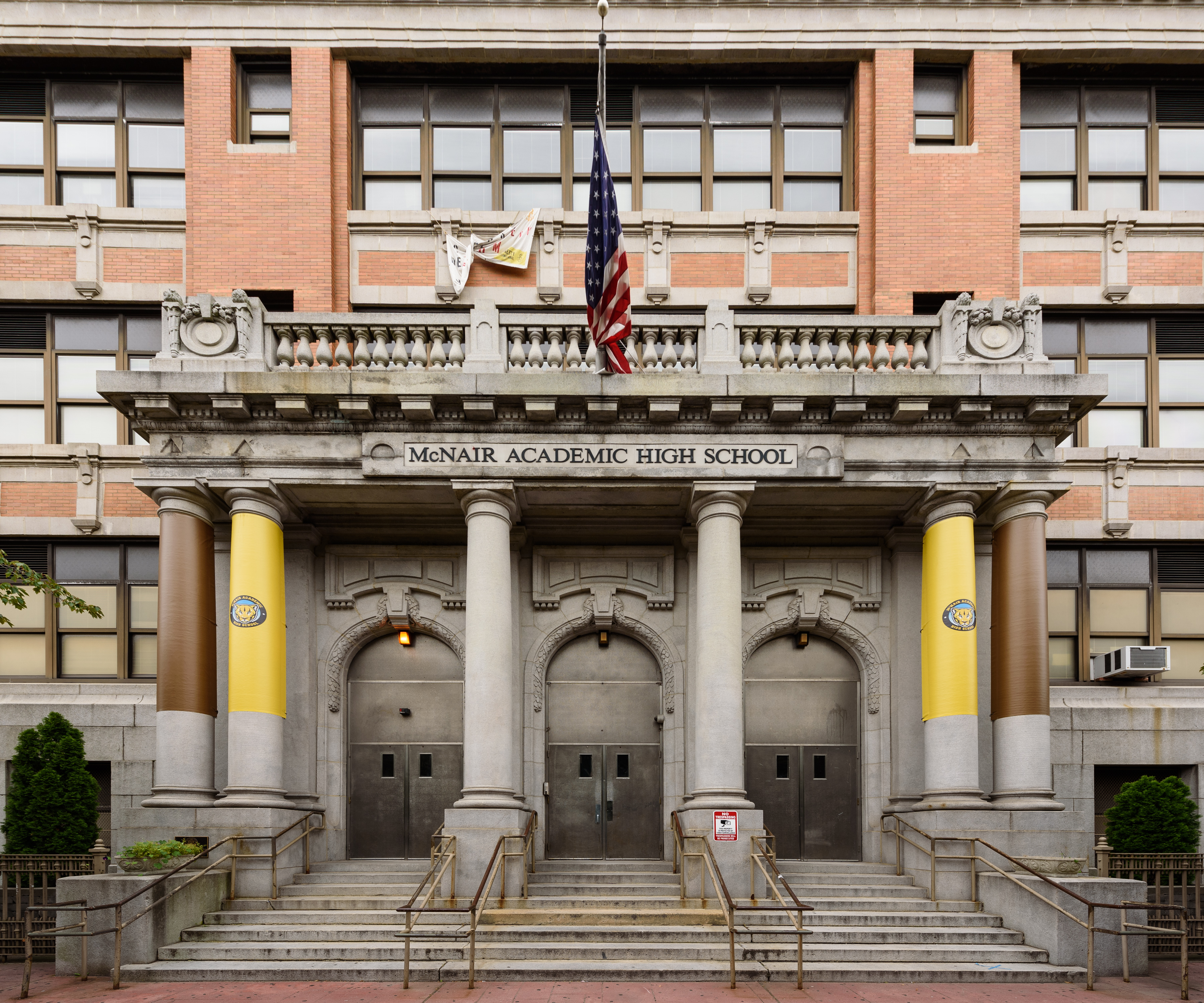

Location
- 123 Coles Street; Jersey City, Hudson County, New Jersey 07302; United States; 40.726467°N 74.047095°W

Information
- Type: Magnet public high school
- Established: 1976
- School district: Jersey City Public Schools
- NCES School ID: 340783002778
- Principal: Francis J. Dooley
- Faculty: 54.5 FTEs
- Grades: 9-12
- Enrollment: 716 (as of 2024–25)
- Student to teacher ratio: 13.1:1
- Colors: Brown and Yellow
- Athletics conference: Hudson County Interscholastic League
- Nickname: Cougars
- Accreditation: Middle States Association of Colleges and Schools
- Publication: Cougar Chronicle
- Website: mhs.jcboe.org

Dr. Ronald E. McNair Academic High School (often dubbed Academic previous to its dedication, or as McNair) is a magnet public high school located at 123 Coles Street in Jersey City, in Hudson County, in the U.S. state of New Jersey. The school is named in memory of Dr. Ronald E. McNair, the astronaut and scientist who died in the Space Shuttle Challenger disaster. McNair is part of the Jersey City Public Schools district. The school has been accredited by the Middle States Association of Colleges and Schools Commission on Elementary and Secondary Schools since 1979 and is under Probationary Accreditation status as of 2022.

Students seeking to attend the school or to transfer in must take the PSAT in order to be considered for attendance. As part of the district's Accelerated Enrichment Program, there is also a lengthy application process involved to attend. This includes a student's PSAT grade, middle school grades, teacher recommendations, attendance, as well as extracurriculars. In 2017, the school received about 1000 applications from across Jersey City, and accepted about 240 of them. This resulted in an acceptance rate of about 24 percent.

As of the 2024–25 school year, the school had an enrollment of 716 students and 54.5 classroom teachers (on an FTE basis), for a student–teacher ratio of 13.1:1. There were 203 students (28.4% of enrollment) eligible for free lunch and 49 (6.8% of students) eligible for reduced-cost lunch.

The school offers a wide selection of Advanced Placement (AP) Courses, in addition to a standard curriculum that contains courses at the Honors level. In 2010, 21 AP courses were offered, with 897 students taking exams and 83.8% of those taking the exams scoring 3 or higher, more than quadruple the statewide average. Most electives are regular, unweighted classes. From 2008 to 2010, 100% of the class has graduated and in 2010, a full 100% of the student body indicated that they planned to attend a four-year college.

== History ==
The school originally opened as Academic High School in 1976 at 70 Sip Avenue in Jersey City. The school also rented a space in a Ukrainian building at 16 Bentley Ave on Bergen Avenue. The school's name was changed to honor the late astronaut in 1996. In 1997, the school moved to its new location at 123 Coles Street, due to safety and spacing reasons.

Beginning in the 2004–05 school year, the incoming class size was increased from 140 students to 200.

In 2004, the school's library was renamed in honor of teacher Vincent Russo. In 2009, McNair lost Dr. Sara Solberg, a teacher of English, French, Shakespeare, and Mythology. The school opened a new stage in 2010 named 'Sara's Stage' in her honor. In 2023, the school's newly renovated gym was renamed in honor of Sharon Felton. Felton spent 38 years as a teacher and volleyball coach for the school before her retirement in 2013.

== Achievements ==
Notable achievements include:

- During the 2008–09 school year, Dr. Ronald E. McNair Academic High School was recognized with the Blue Ribbon School Award of Excellence by the United States Department of Education, the highest award an American school can receive.
- In its 2013 report on "America's Best High Schools", The Daily Beast ranked the school 61st in the nation among participating public high schools and 4th among schools in New Jersey.
- In the 2011 "Ranking America's High Schools" issue by The Washington Post, the school was ranked 1st in New Jersey and 52nd nationwide.
- 26th place in U.S. News & World Report's November 29, 2007 issue listing the Best High Schools in the United States. McNair Academic High School was also named a Gold Medal School by U.S. News & World Report for making the Top 100 list.
- The school was ranked 85th in the Newsweek 2009 ranking of the top 1,500 high schools in the United States and was the top-ranked school in New Jersey, with 3.993 AP tests taken in 2008 per graduating senior and 80% of all graduating seniors passing at least one AP exam. The school was ranked 27th place in Newsweek's May 22, 2007, issue listing the Top Public High Schools in the United States; the school was ranked in 83rd place in the 2006 survey and 15th in the 2005 rankings.
- The title of "Star School" during the 2004–05 school year by the New Jersey Department of Education—the highest honor that a New Jersey school can achieve.
- For the 2005–06 school year, the school was one of 22 schools statewide selected as Governor's School of Excellence Winners, an award given to schools that have demonstrated significant improvement over the previous two academic years.
- The school was the 62nd-ranked public high school in New Jersey out of 339 schools statewide in New Jersey Monthly magazine's September 2014 cover story on the state's "Top Public High Schools", using a new ranking methodology. The school had been ranked 2nd in the state of 328 schools in 2012, after also being ranked 2nd in 2010 out of 322 schools listed. The magazine ranked the school second in the state in its 2008 report. The school was ranked 1st in the magazine's 2006 rankings out of 316 schools included across the state.
- On November 30, 2007, McNair Academic was featured on News 12 New Jersey having ranked among the top 100 public high schools in the country.
- Schooldigger.com ranked the school as one of 16 schools tied for first out of 381 public high schools statewide in its 2011 rankings (an increase of 236 positions from the 2010 rank) which were based on the combined percentage of students classified as proficient or above proficient on the language arts literacy (100.0%) and mathematics (100.0%) components of the High School Proficiency Assessment (HSPA).
- In 2016, McNair Academic was ranked as the third-best high school in the state of New Jersey, 165th best STEM high school and 48th best high school in the country by U.S. News & World Report.
- The school was one of 18 schools statewide (and three public high schools) honored in 2018 by the National Blue Ribbon Schools Program run by the United States Department of Education, marking the second time the school was recognized by the program.
- The school was ranked #5 among the most diverse public high schools in New Jersey by Niche in 2026.

== Standards ==
In 1976, McNair Academic High School (then Academic High School) was established as a desegregation school. All applicants must test for admission, attain high test scores, and are selected based on multiple criteria, in addition to meeting the school's diversity goals.

The school enforces a business-type dress code (though not a school uniform) for both students and teachers. The basic protocols dictate the following:

- Sneakers and shorts are permitted only in physical education classes.
- Boys are required to wear slacks, button-down collared shirt, and tie for the entire school year, complemented by an optional suit jacket. A V-neck sweater during the autumn and winter seasons is permissible.
- Girls are advised to wear appropriate business attire. Pants or skirts above the knee are not allowed.

Students are also required to fulfill 50 mandatory community service hours. Although the requirement was waived for the 2020-2021 graduating classes due to COVID-19. They must also maintain a final grade of 70 or higher on all of their courses. Students with a failing final grade in one course must go to summer school in order to pass the course. Student receiving a failing final grade in two or more courses cannot re-enroll in the school the following school year and must instead attend a local public or private high school.

== Athletics ==
The McNair Academic Cougars compete as part of the Hudson County Interscholastic League, which is comprised of public and private high schools in Hudson County. The conference operates under the supervision of the New Jersey State Interscholastic Athletic Association (NJSIAA). With 515 students in grades 10–12, the school was classified by the NJSIAA for the 2023–24 school year as Group II for most athletic competition purposes, which included schools with an enrollment of 452 to 698 students in that grade range.

The girls' cross country team has won the North II Group I state sectional championships in 2005, 2006, 2008, 2012, 2017, 2018, and 2019.

The boys' cross country team has won the North II Group I state sectional championships in 2011, 2012, 2018, 2020, and 2022.

The girls' spring track and field team has won North II Group I state sectional championships in 1999 and 2007.

The boys' spring track and field team won the North II Group I state sectional championships in 2007.

In 2006, junior Leslie Njoku won the 2006 state 400m hurdle title with a time of 59.48 and won the 400m hurdle title at the Nike Outdoor Nationals with a time of 59.28.

The boys' indoor track team won the North II Group I state sectional championships and Group I state championship in 2017.

== School programs and clubs ==
Beyond McNair's own internal visual and performing arts programs, McNair also works closely with the Visual and Performing Arts program at the Henry Snyder High School, where McNair students may choose to apply into four-year arts intensives.

Every year McNair's Science Research students face stiff competition at the various levels of competition, such as Hudson County Science Fair, Junior Science and Humanities Competition, Siemens Westinghouse, and the Intel International Science and Engineering Fair.

In 2022, freshman Shreeya Shankerdas founded a club at McNair dedicated to the Marvel Comics superhero Kamala Khan (aka Ms. Marvel), who is herself a native of Jersey City. The club's name, the Coles Kamala Korps, was taken from the fictional Jersey City school attended by the character, which in turn was inspired by McNair itself. Shankerdas commented, "When I first heard about Ms. Marvel being this brown teenage girl, I thought it was really cool that we're finally represented. On top of that, we were represented in the Marvel Universe, and I thought that was really cool, because it's a big company."

== Administration ==
The school's principal is Francis J. Dooley. Core members of the school's administration include the assistant principal.

== Notable alumni ==
- Mussab Ali (born 1997), activist / politician who served on the board of education of the Jersey City Public Schools
- Joseph Trapanese (born 1984), composer.

== In popular culture ==
Coles Academic High School, the high school that Kamala Khan attends, is loosely based on McNair Academic.
