= Kean Jersey City =

Public university in Jersey City, New Jersey, US

Coordinates: 40°42′34″N 74°05′19″W

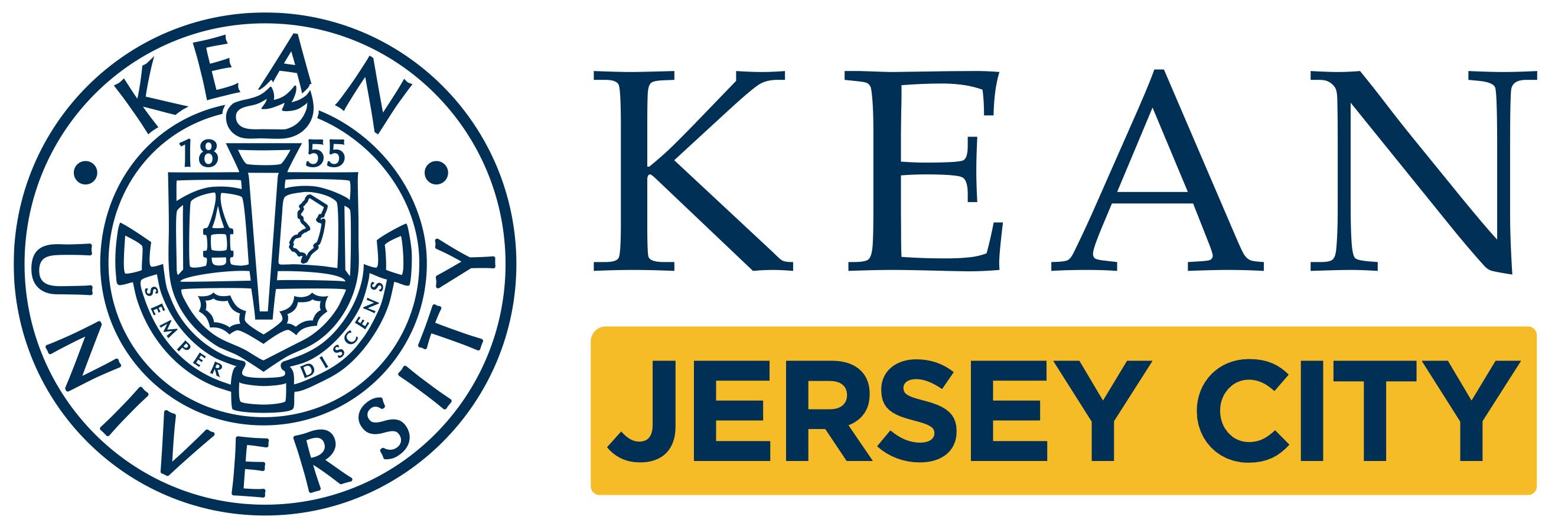
- Former names: New Jersey State Normal School at Jersey City (1927–1935); New Jersey State Teachers College at Jersey City (1935–1958); Jersey City State College (1958–1998); New Jersey City University (1998–2026)
- Motto: Semper Discens
- Motto in English: Always Learning
- Type: Public university
- Established: 1927
- Academic affiliations: Sea-grant, space-grant
- Endowment: US$12.5 million
- Chancellor: Andrés Acebo
- President: Lamont Repollet
- Undergraduates: 6,800
- Postgraduates: 2,350
- Other students: 510 (continuing education)
- Location: Jersey City, New Jersey, U.S.
- Campus: Urban, 46 acres (19 ha)
- Colors: Kean Blue; Jersey City Green; Jersey City Gold
- Nickname: Gothic Knights
- Sporting affiliations: United States Collegiate Athletic Association
- Website: kean.edu/jerseycity

Kean Jersey City is a public university in Jersey City, New Jersey. It is part of New Jersey's public system of higher education and is a state-designated research university. It became part of Kean University when New Jersey City University merged with it on July 1, 2026.

== Historical chronology ==
- 1927: The New Jersey State Normal School at Jersey City was chartered. The institution was built to accommodate 1,000 students and an eight-room demonstration school in its one building, Hepburn Hall, on 10 acres (40,000 m^{2}) on what was then Hudson Boulevard.
- 1935: The name was changed to New Jersey State Teachers College at Jersey City. The institution was authorized to offer a four-year teacher education program and award the Bachelor of Science degree in education.
- 1936: A degree program in health education and nursing was initiated in cooperation with the Jersey City Medical Center for the training of school nurses.
- 1958: New Jersey State Teachers College at Jersey City became Jersey City State College and was authorized to award the bachelor of arts degree.
- 1959: The institution began to offer the Master of Arts degree in elementary education.
- 1968: Jersey City State College became a multipurpose institution, authorized to develop a liberal arts program and to enlarge teacher preparation programs.
- 1981: The Thomas Edison Film Festival established as the Black Maria Film and Video Festival at NJCU Media Arts Department.
- 1985: The institution was awarded a $5.7 million Governor's Challenge Grant for an expanded Cooperative Education Program, which would serve all academic majors.
- 1998: The New Jersey Commission on Higher Education approved a petition submitted by the JCSC Board of Trustees requesting that the institution be granted university status and renamed New Jersey City University. The university was restructured into three colleges: Arts and Sciences, Education, and Professional Studies.
- 2003: NJCU joined with the City of Jersey City, the Jersey City Board of Education, and New Jersey Transit to collaborate on the West Side/Bayfront urban development plan.
- 2012: After 19 years, NJCU President Carlos Hernandez retired. Under his tenure, three new buildings were erected and, in 1998, the school became a university.
- 2013: On September 20, NJCU inaugurated Dr. Sue Henderson to be the 12th president of the University, the first woman to hold the position.
- 2016: First building of major campus expansion opened.
- 2022: In June 2022, NJCU declared a financial emergency and sought a $10 million lifeline from the state government. Henderson resigned as president of the university, effective July 1. In August, Governor Phil Murphy called for an investigation into NJCU's dramatic change in financial standing from a surplus of $108 million in 2013 to a deficit of $67 million amid plans to expand NJCU's campus. It was later learned that there was never a surplus and those facts were misreported. The university did have a $22.7 million operating deficit. The university announced a cut of 37% of its academic offerings. Campus expansion was curtailed.
- 2025: Kean University submitted a proposal and letter of intent to execute a merger with New Jersey City University. On March 5, the NJCU Board of Trustees voted to explore the possibility.
- 2026: On January 12, New Jersey Governor Phil Murphy signed legislation formalizing the merger with Kean University.
- 2026: On July 1, New Jersey City University officially joined Kean University as Kean Jersey City. The university was restructured and NJCU students became Kean students.

== Academics ==
Kean Jersey City is organized into three colleges: the William J. Maxwell College of Arts and Sciences, the Deborah Cannon Partridge Wolfe College of Education (named for Deborah Wolfe), and the College of Professional Studies. It offers 59 undergraduate programs and 31 graduate programs.

Kean Jersey City students have the opportunity to study across at all locations within the Kean University USA system of campuses, including Kean University Union, Kean Ocean, and Kean Skylands; and abroad in China at Wenzhou-Kean University.

== Campus ==
=== Main campus ===
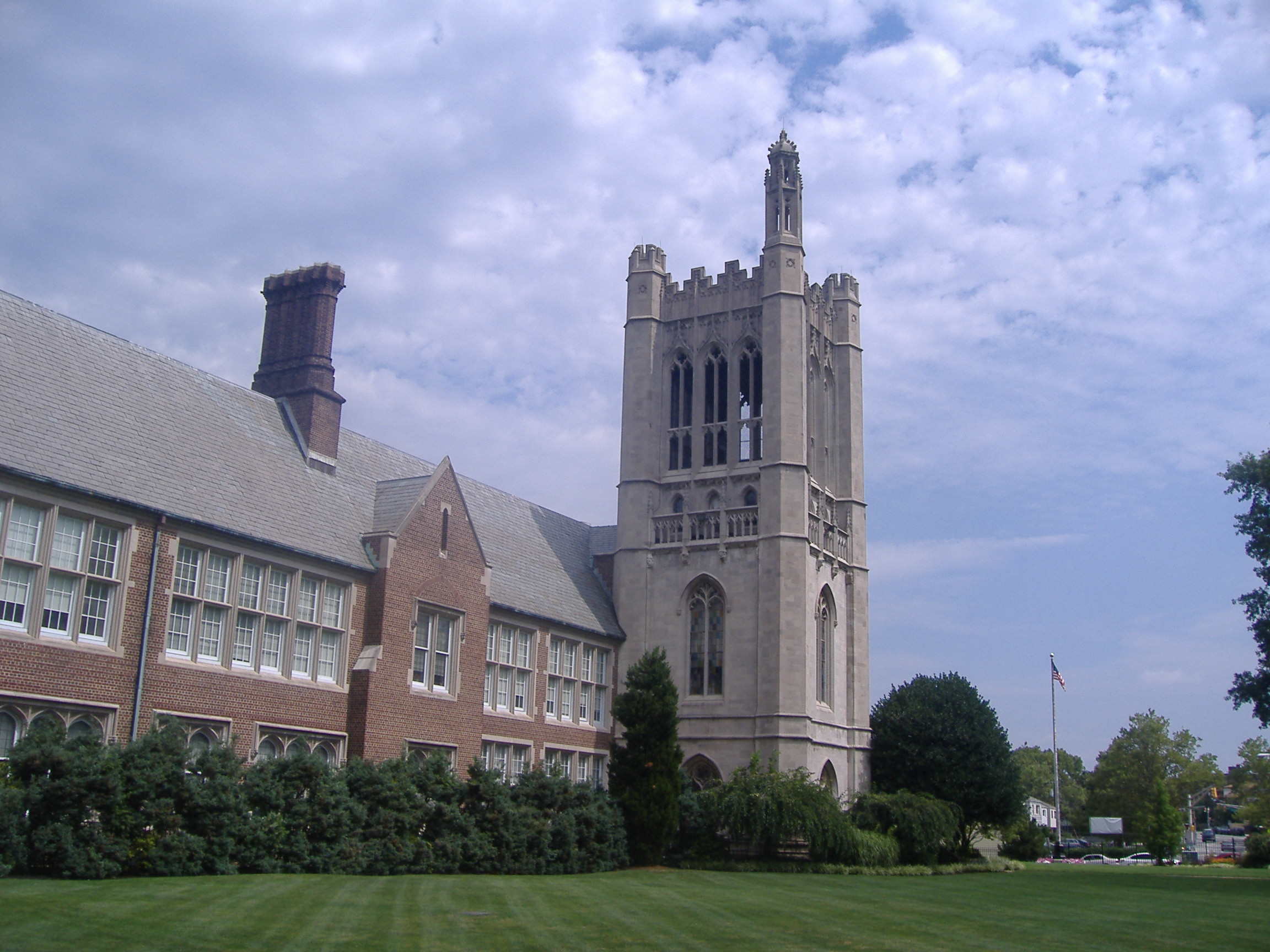
Hepburn Hall.

The university's main campus is situated on Kennedy Boulevard. The administrative center is Hepburn Hall, designed by Guilbert and Betelle in the Collegiate Gothic style and completed in 1930. It is named for Clara Hepburn, a physical education teacher during the school's early years. It is symbol of the university and inspire the name of its newspaper and sports teams.

The university's library was built in 1968, originally as the Irwin Library, and later renamed to honor Frank Guarini. The six-story Arts and Sciences building named Karnoutsos Hall (called the K Building or Crayola building) was designed by architect Michael Graves and constructed in 2006. The 77,000-square-foot (7,200 m^{2}) building houses 14 classrooms, 10 computer labs, faculty offices. Other academic buildings include: Rossey Hall, the Science Building, the Professional Studies Building, Fries Hall, and Grossnickle Hall. The Student Union Building, later named for Michael B. Gilligan, was built in 1976. The Visual Arts Building (2003) on Culver Avenue features a Maya Lin sculpture in the entrance garden area. The John J. Moore Athletics and Fitness Center (1994) is at Culver Avenue and West Side Avenue. The Thomas M. Gerrity Athletic Complex is less than a mile southwest of the main campus on Route 440 near Droyers Point on Newark Bay.

==== Academic buildings ====
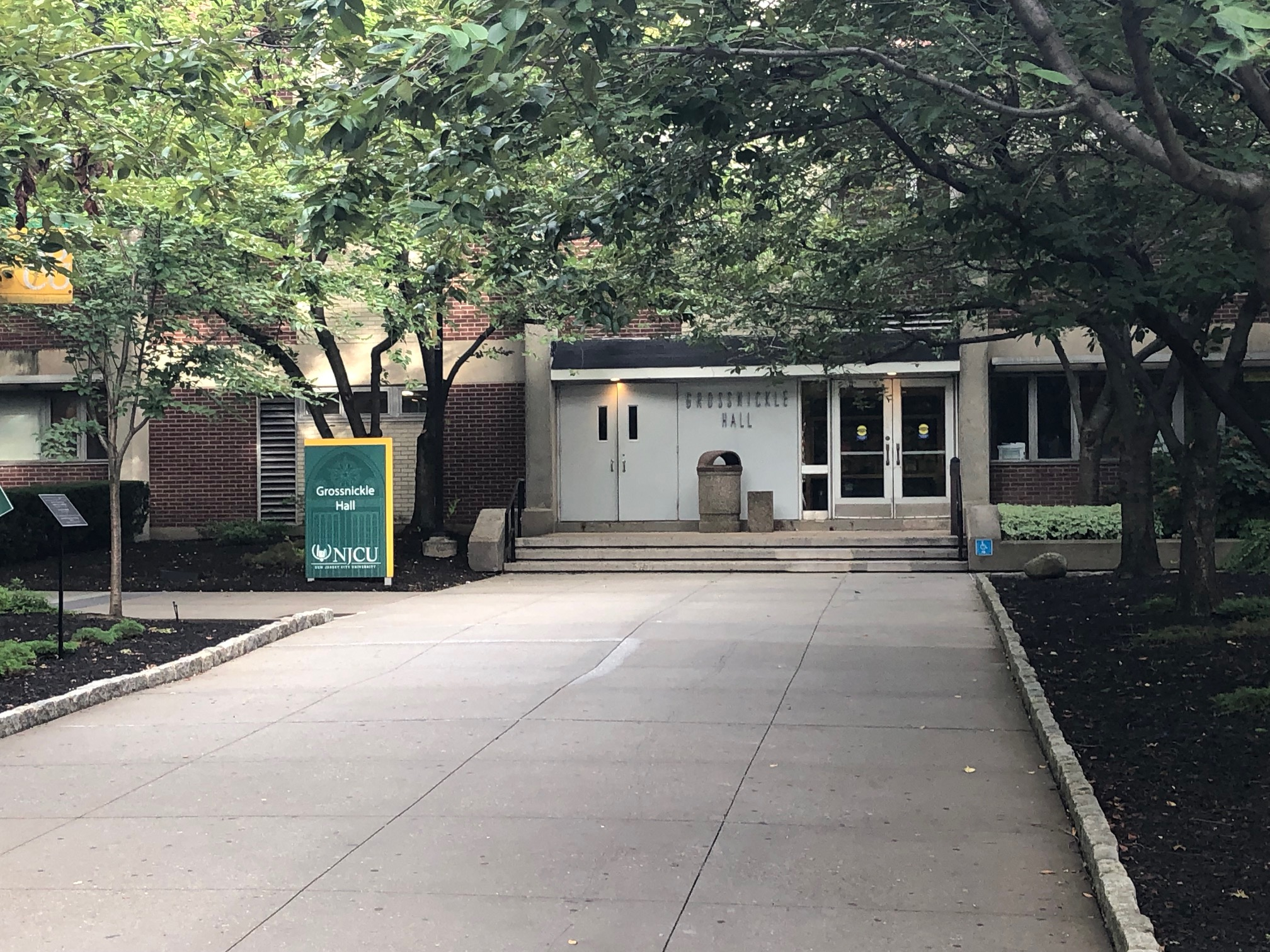
Grossnickle Hall

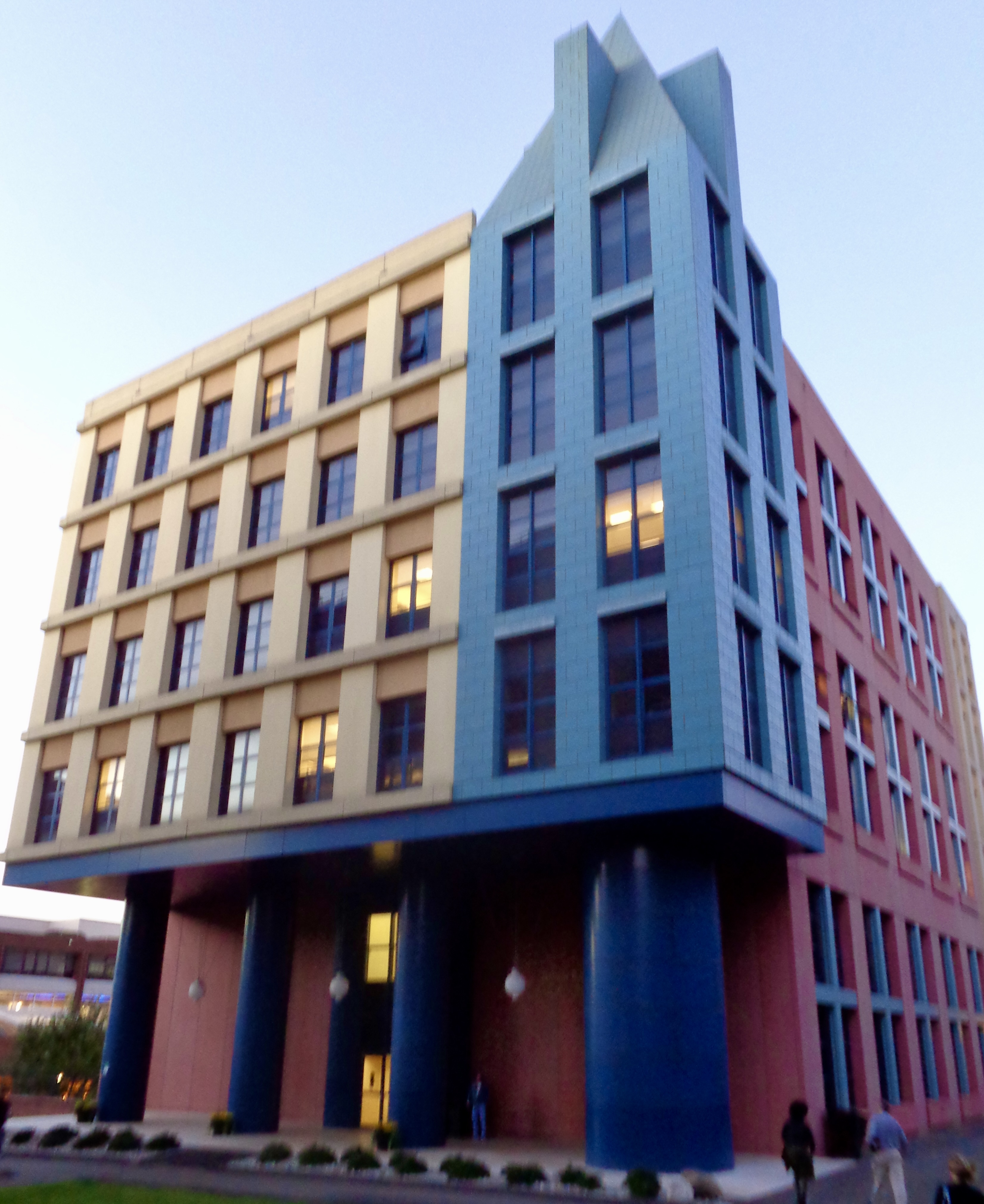
Karnoutsos Hall

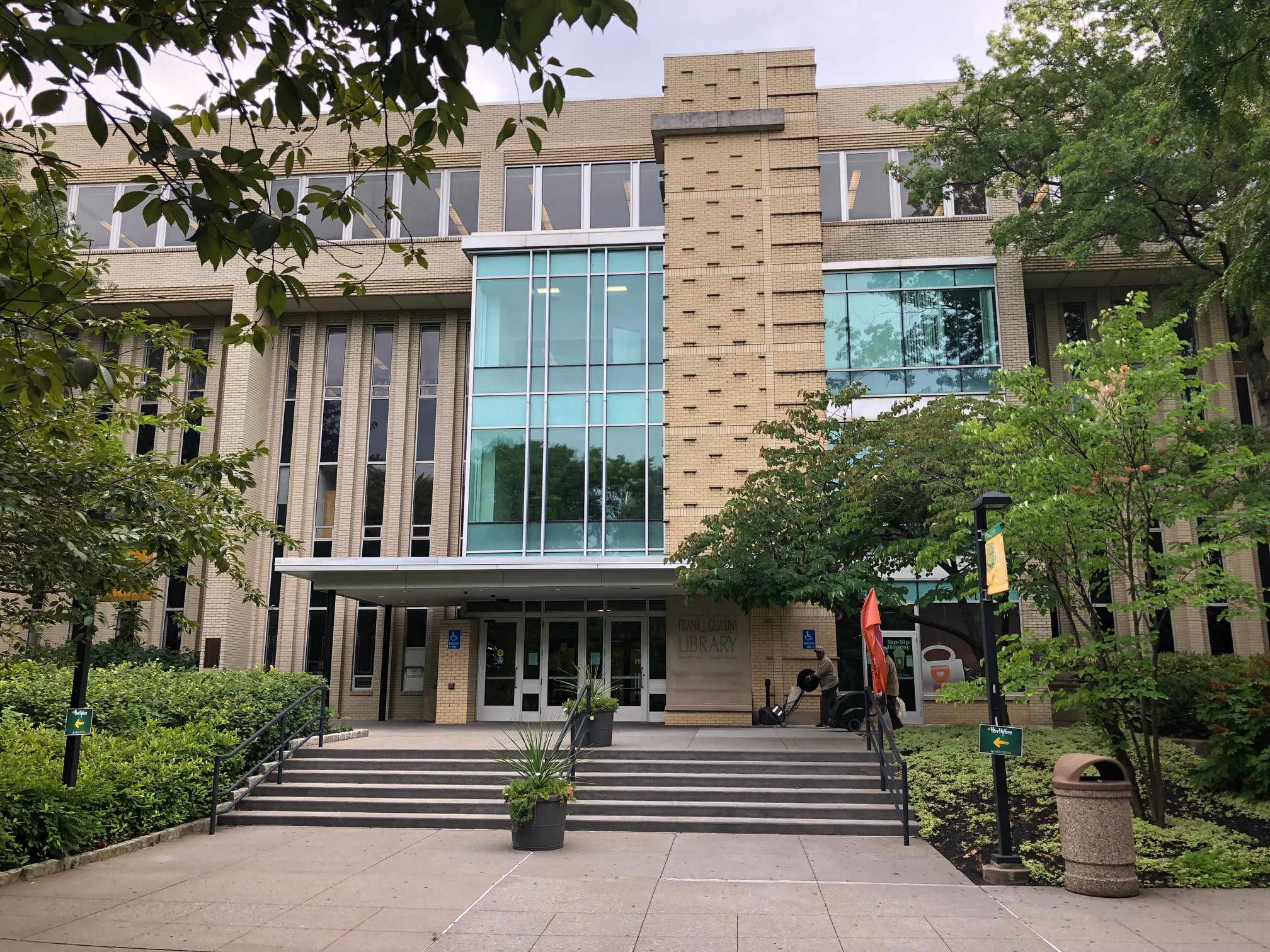
Guarini Library

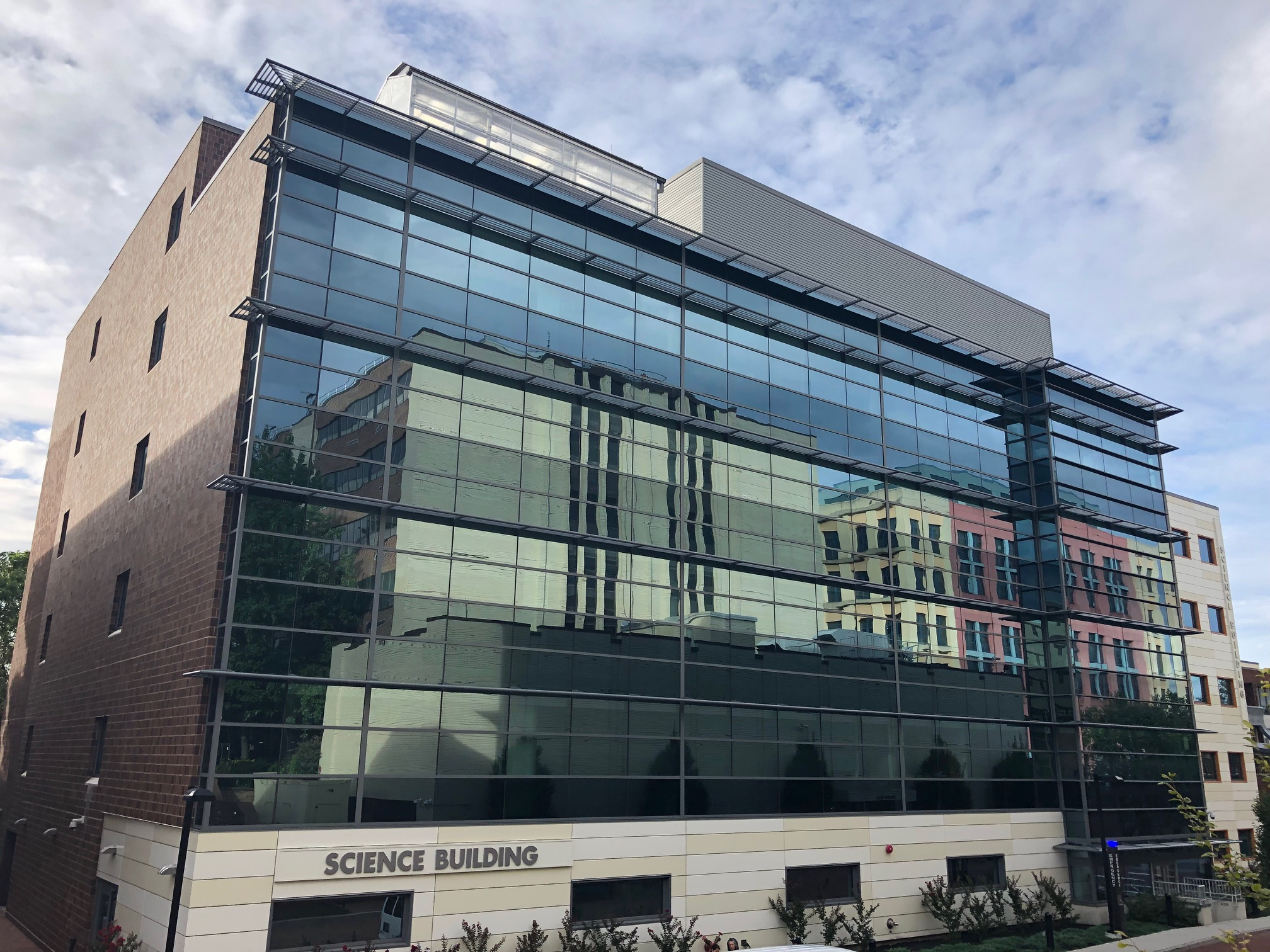
Science Building

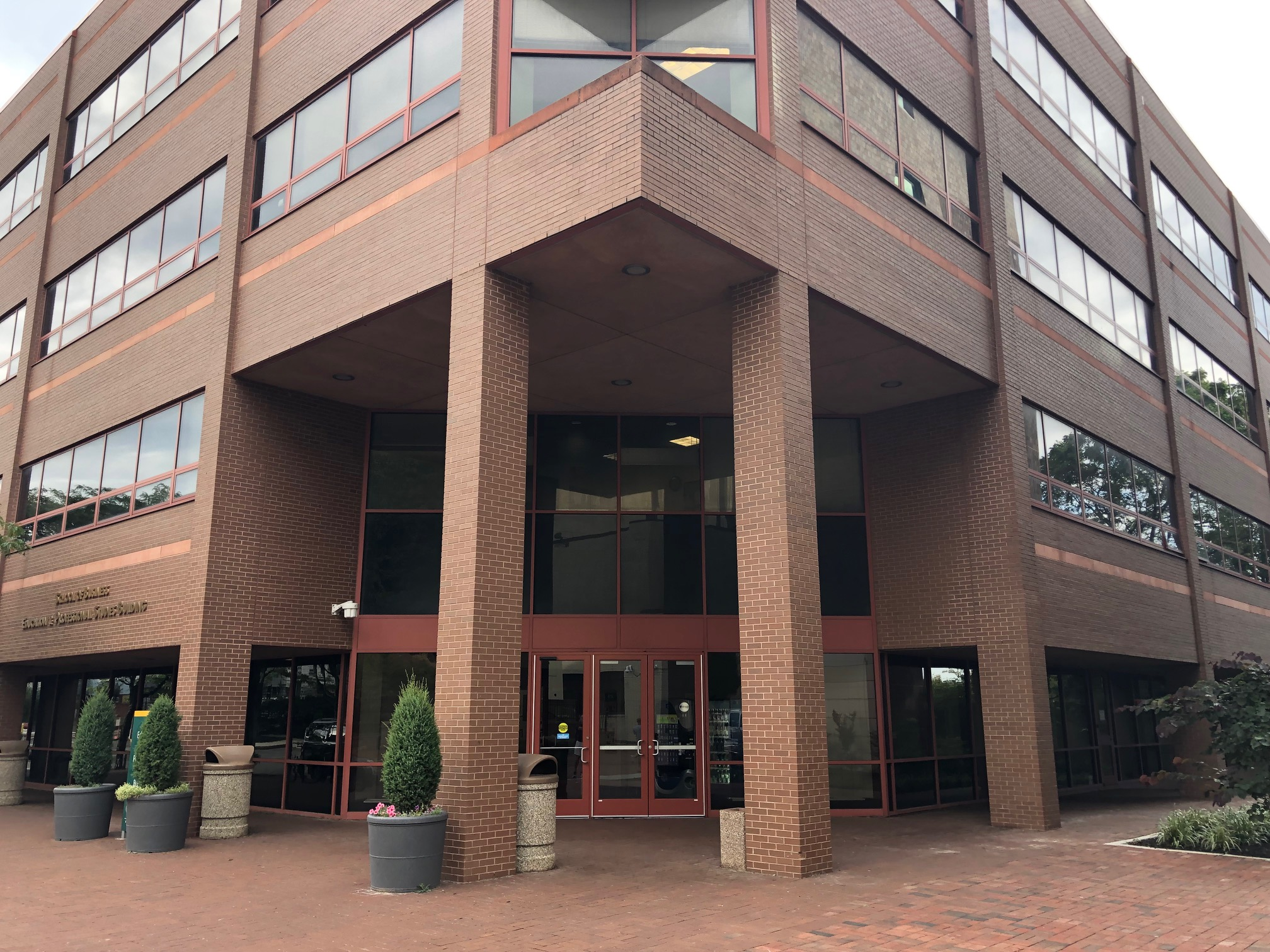
Business, Education & Professional Studies

=== A. Harry Moore Laboratory School ===
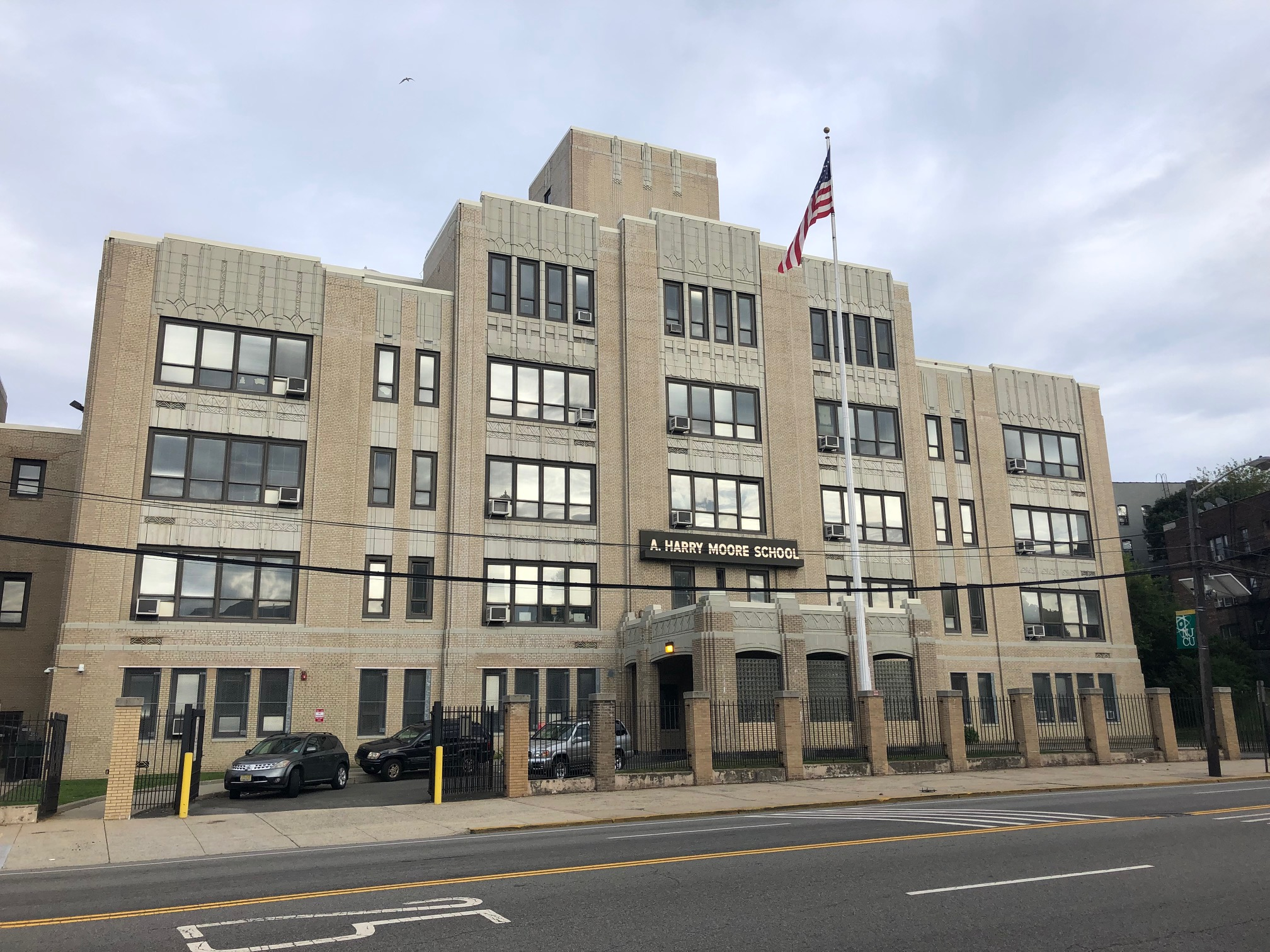
A. Harry Moore School

A special needs school operated by Kean and the Jersey City Board of Education, the A. Harry Moore Laboratory School was first opened in 1931 and has operated under the direction of the university since 1963. It is located on Kennedy Boulevard across from the main campus. It offers academic, therapeutic, and social programs for approximately 140 students between the ages of three and 21. who are classified as Preschool Disabled, Learning and Language Disabled, and/or Multiply Disabled.

=== Kean at Harborside ===
In September 2015, the NJCU School of Business opened at Harborside Plaza on the Hudson Waterfront. Following the NJCU-Kean merger, the School of Business was consolidated on the main campus, it was renovated and rebranded as Kean at Harborside, an executive space and event center.

=== West campus ===
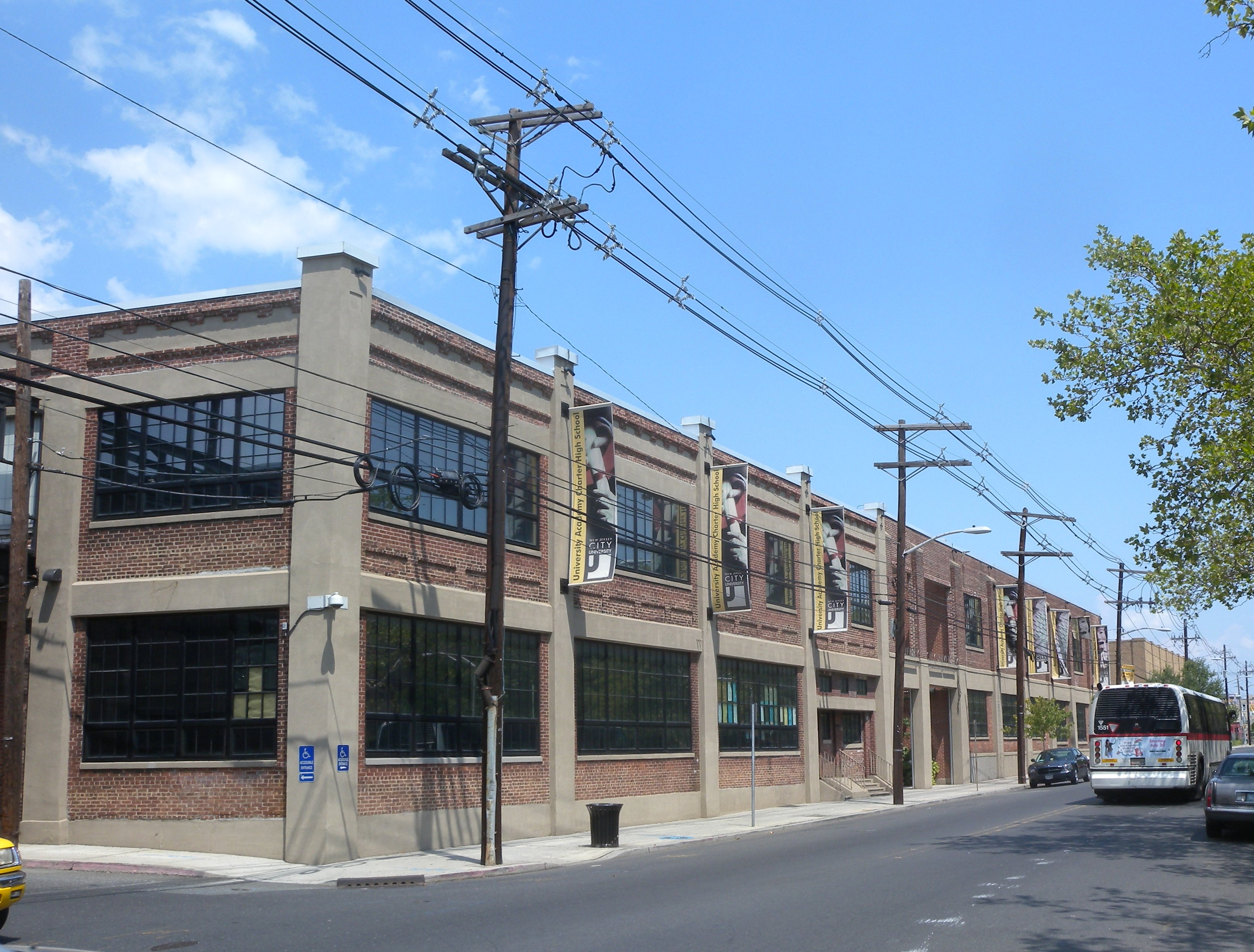
University Academy Charter High School on West Side Avenue

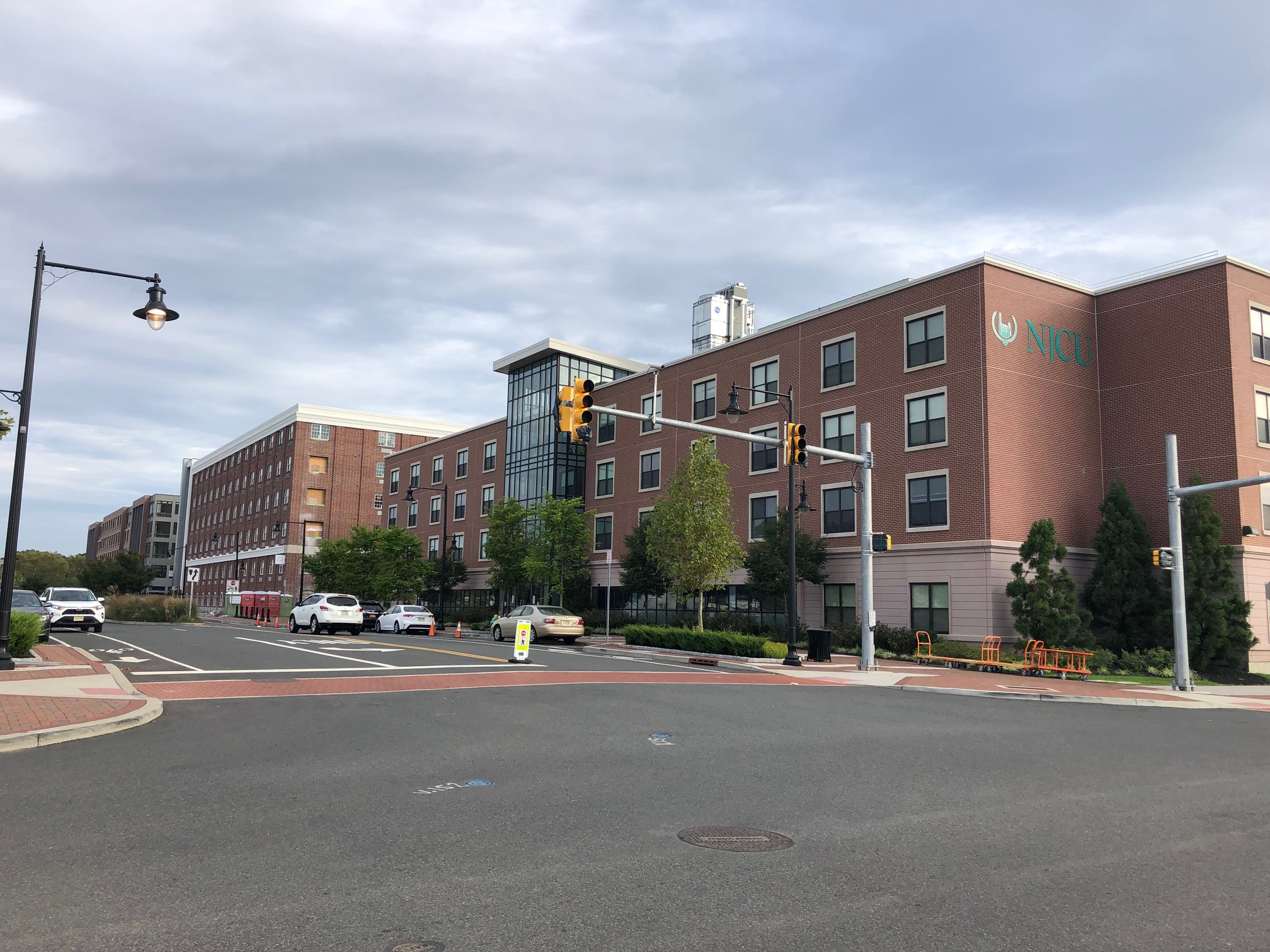
West Campus Village

Renovated buildings on West Side Avenue include the West Side Theatre, used for theatrical productions and community events. Another building houses the Business Development Incubator program. The affiliated University Academy Charter High School opened in 2002 and offers scholarships to students with a high grade average.

Construction began on the 21-acre (8.5-hectare) "West Campus" between West Side Avenue and Bayfront on Route 440 in the mid-2010s, which would have more than doubled the university's footprint, and was to have included academic buildings, residences, retail spaces, parking, and a promenade. The first building, a student residence, opened in 2016. A new performing arts center would have housed the Joffrey Ballet School. Plans for further expansion were curtailed in 2022 due to financial difficulties and decreased enrollment.

=== Campus living ===
Vodra Hall, a traditional dormitory with shared bathrooms between rooms for upper-class students and special needs individuals on the main campus. West Campus Village is a suite-style residence hall at University Place.

== Athletics ==
Kean Jersey City is a full member of the United States Collegiate Athletic Association (USCAA). Beginning with the 2026–2027 season, athletes compete in the USCAA for women's soccer and men's basketball, and keep the Gothic Knights moniker. Athletes on other former NJCU teams were given the opportunity to compete with Kean University's National Collegiate Athletic Association (NCAA) teams, called Cougars.

=== Facilities ===
The John J. Moore Athletics and Fitness Center (1994) is a 72,000-square-foot (6,700 m2) facility a 2,000-seat basketball and volleyball arena, an exercise and fitness center, a 25-yard (23 m) swimming and diving pool, and a one-tenth-mile (160 m) elevated jogging track.

The Thomas M. Gerrity Athletic Complex is less than a mile southwest of the main campus on Route 440 near Droyers Point on Newark Bay. In 2017, the New York Red Bulls of Major League Soccer entered into a facility usage partnership with the university to upgrade the natural grass soccer training field to professionally approved standards to allow national and international teams to train at the facility ahead of their matches at Red Bull Arena. until the team opened new facilities in Morristown.

== Student newspaper ==
The Gothic Times is New Jersey City University's official student newspaper. It was reintroduced in 2001 and prints monthly issues, excluding June, July and August. It features stories about campus happenings as well as articles on lifestyle, sports, arts and entertainment. It also includes an editorial and opinion/advice section.

== Presidents ==
- Dr. William Allen Messler (1929–1934)
- Dr. Roy L. Shaffer (1934–1940)
- Dr. Chris C. Rossey (1940–1946)
- Dr. Michael B. Gilligan (1954–1968)
- Dr. James H. Mullen (1968–1973)
- Dr. William J. Maxwell (1974–1992)
- Dr. Carlos Hernández (1993–1998)
- Dr. Sue Henderson (2012–2022)
- Andrés Acebo (2023–2026)
- Dr. Lamont Repollet (2026–present)

== See also ==
- Category:New Jersey City University faculty
- Category:New Jersey City University alumni
- Hudson County Community College
