= Holy Family Academy (Bayonne, New Jersey) =

Defunct Catholic high school in Hudson County, New Jersey, United States

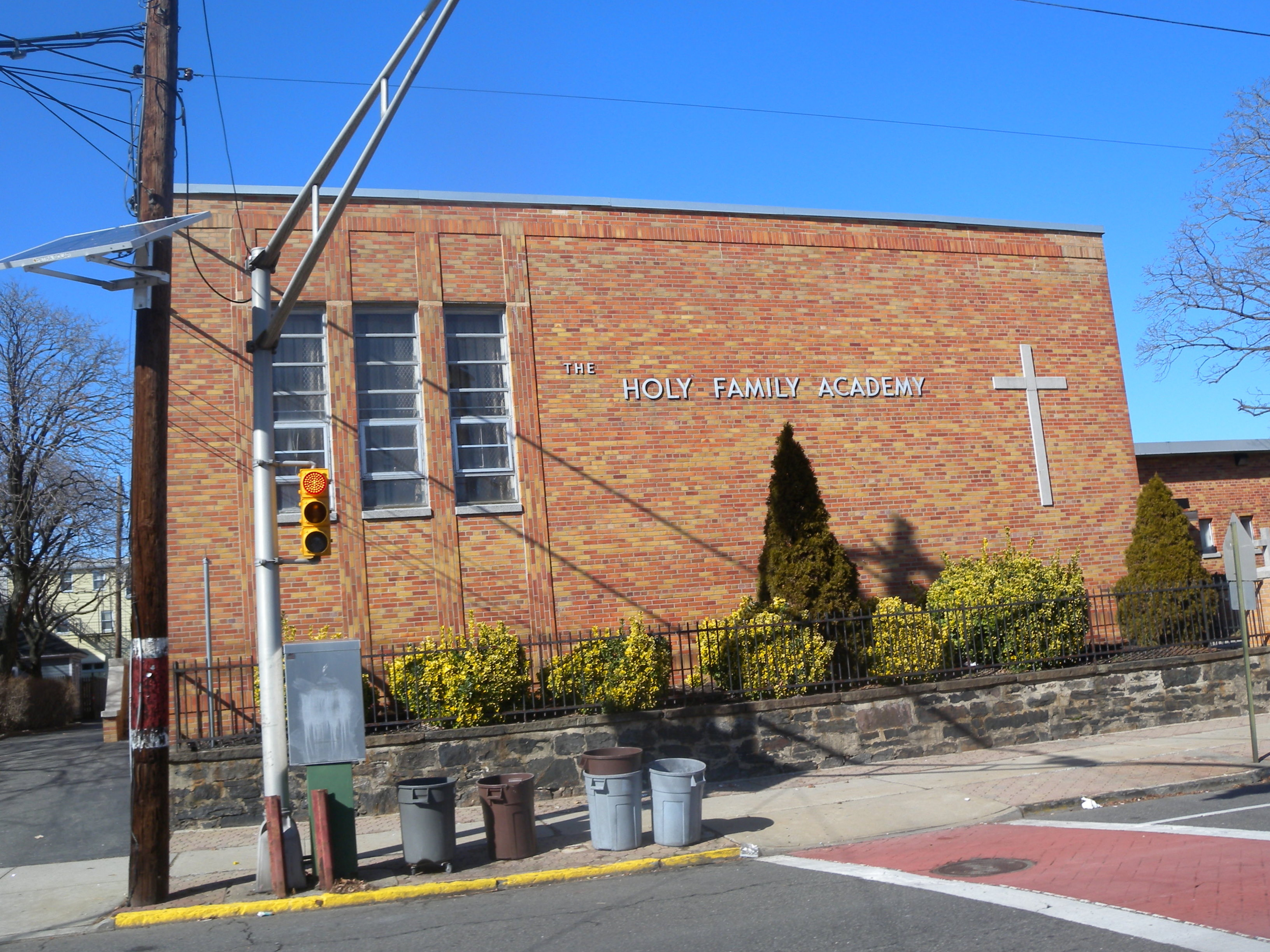

Location
- 239 Avenue A Bayonne, (Hudson County), New Jersey 07002
- 40°39′24″N 74°8′1″W

Information
- Type: Private
- Motto: "Women of Vision; learners and leaders for a lifetime"
- Religious affiliations: Roman Catholic, Sisters of St. Joseph
- Established: 1925
- Status: Closed
- Closed: June 2013
- Oversight: Archdiocese of Newark
- President: Karen Fasanella
- Principal: Susan Ward
- Faculty: 29.4 (on FTE basis)
- Grades: 9–12
- Gender: Girls
- Enrollment: 173 (2009-10)
- Student to teacher ratio: 5.9:1
- Colors: Purple and gold
- Athletics conference: Hudson County Interscholastic League
- Team name: Falcons
- Accreditation: Middle States Association of Colleges and Schools
- Publication: Musings (literary magazine)
- Newspaper: Harvester
- Yearbook: Harvest
- Dean of Studies: Jean Stroud
- Website: www.hfa.bayonne.net

Holy Family Academy was a private Roman Catholic college preparatory school for young women located in Bayonne, in Hudson County, New Jersey, founded by the Sisters of St. Joseph in 1925 that closed in June 2013. The most recent building, 239 Avenue A, was dedicated in 1954. The school operated under the supervision of the Roman Catholic Archdiocese of Newark. The school had been accredited by the Middle States Association of Colleges and Schools Commission on Elementary and Secondary Schools since 1965.

Students were enrolled mostly from Hudson County, Northern New Jersey, and New York City. As of the 2009–10 school year, the school had an enrollment of 173 students and 29.4 classroom teachers for a student to teacher ratio of 5.9:1.

The school was a member of the National Catholic Educational Association (NCEA); Assigned School ID: 863985.

== History ==
Holy Family was established in 1925 by the Sisters of Saint Joseph to provide Catholic higher education for the city of Bayonne. Holy Family's first building was the Clark residence at 115 West Eighth Street. The first students, six boys and forty-three girls, continued the commercial course they had begun at St. Mary's and graduated in June 1926. Enrollment increased and the properties at 109 and 119 West Eighth Street were acquired to meet the need. A four-year program was initiated and the school, after being accredited, graduated its first four-year class in June 1929. HFA graduated its last co-ed class in 1949. In 1954, the most recent building at 239 Avenue A was dedicated. (The Marist Brothers began a school for young men in the Eighth Street buildings.) In 2008 the Sisters of Saint Joseph announced that they were no longer able to own, operate or support Holy Family Academy. In July 2009, Holy Family Academy was renamed Holy Family Academy of Bayonne and governance was assumed by a board of trustees. Though the school was still operating under the auspices of the Roman Catholic Archdiocese of Newark, it became independent from the Sisters of Saint Joseph. Holy Family Academy of Bayonne was accredited by the Middle States Association Commissions on Elementary and Secondary Schools in 2012–2013. The final class of girls graduated in June 2013. On August 17, 2013 the contents of the building were sold through a listing on Craig's list and through advertisements in newspapers and through social media.

== Academics ==
HFA's building had a gymnasium/auditorium, chapel, two science labs, three computer labs, a guidance building, and a library media center. Students at Holy Family were required to take four English courses, four mathematics courses, three science courses (four recommended), two World Language (Latin, Spanish or French) courses (four strongly recommended), two United States History courses, one World History course, one Physical Education course, one Health/Driver's Education course, and four Theology courses. The school offered Advanced Placement classes, two college classes through Saint Peter's University, (English Literature and Calculus) and one college course through Caldwell College (Forensic Science), along with a strong Honors program. The Art, Business, and Technology Departments offered many electives. The school overall offered electives in all disciplines.

== Activities ==
- Ambassador Club
- Assemblies
- Chapel Crew
- Chorus
- Dance Troupe
- E.R.A.S.E.
- Earth Matters
- Extraordinary ministers of Holy Communion
- Falconidae (Alumnae Newsletter)
- Fontbonne Scholars
- Harvest (Yearbook)
- Harvester (newspaper)
- Musings (Literary Magazine)
- Musicals
- National Honor Society
- Orchestra
- SADD
- Student Council

== Adult Organizations ==
- Board of Advisors
- Mothers' Club
- Fathers' Club
- Alumni Mothers
- St. Joseph's Guild

== Athletics ==
Holy Family Academy competed in the Hudson County Interscholastic League, following a reorganization of sports leagues in Northern New Jersey by the New Jersey State Interscholastic Athletic Association.

- Fall: Cross Country, Volleyball, Soccer, Tennis
- Winter: Indoor Track & Field, Basketball, Swimming, Bowling
- Spring: Outdoor Track & Field, Softball

The boys basketball team won the Non-Public Group B state championship in 1948 (defeating St. Mary's High School of South Amboy in the tournament final), and won the Non-Public Group C title in 1955 and 1956 (vs. Wildwood Catholic High School in both years), 1962 (vs. St. Joseph High School of Hammonton) and in 1964 and 1965 (vs. Wildwood Catholic both years).

== Notable alumni ==
- Pat Colasurdo Mayo (born 1957), former basketball player who played professionally for the San Francisco Pioneers of the Women's Professional Basketball League
