= Saint Dominic Academy =

New Jersey Catholic girls high school

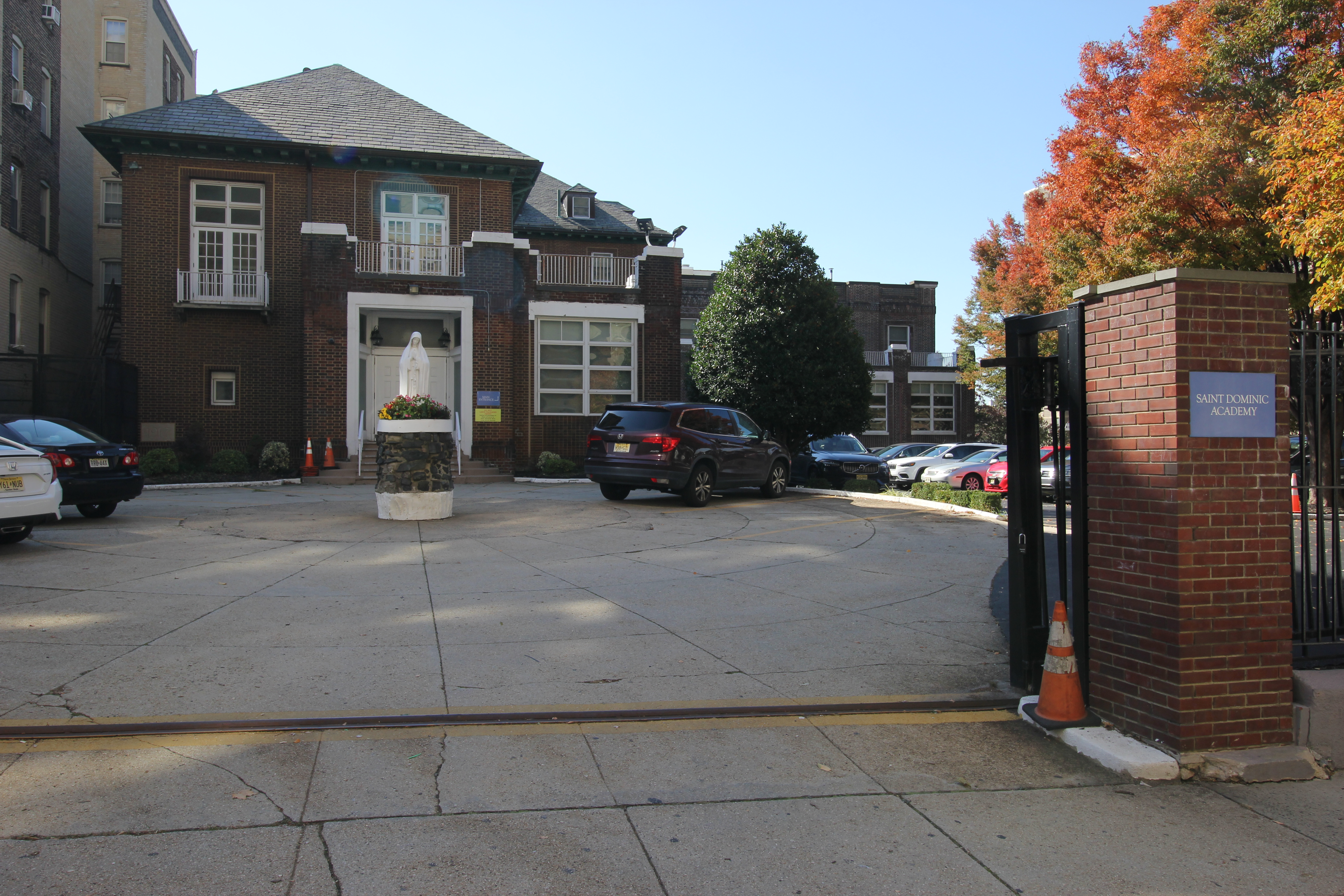

Location
- 2572 John F. Kennedy Boulevard; Jersey City, Hudson County, New Jersey 07304; United States; 40°43′29″N 74°4′24″W

Information
- Type: Private
- Religious affiliations: Roman Catholic (Dominican Sisters)
- Established: 1878
- NCES School ID: 00862518
- Head of school: Elizabeth Christou-Woodall
- Faculty: 20.9 FTEs
- Grades: 7–12
- Gender: Girls
- Enrollment: 189 (as of 2023–24)
- Student to teacher ratio: 9:1
- Colors: Crest Blue and Berry Red
- Slogan: Empowering Women for Leadership since 1878
- Athletics conference: Hudson County Interscholastic League
- Mascot: Blue Devil
- Nickname: SDA; Saint Dom's
- Team name: Blue Devils
- Accreditation: Middle States Association of Colleges and Schools
- Tuition: $19,500 (grades 9–12 for 2026–27)
- Website: www.saintdoms.org
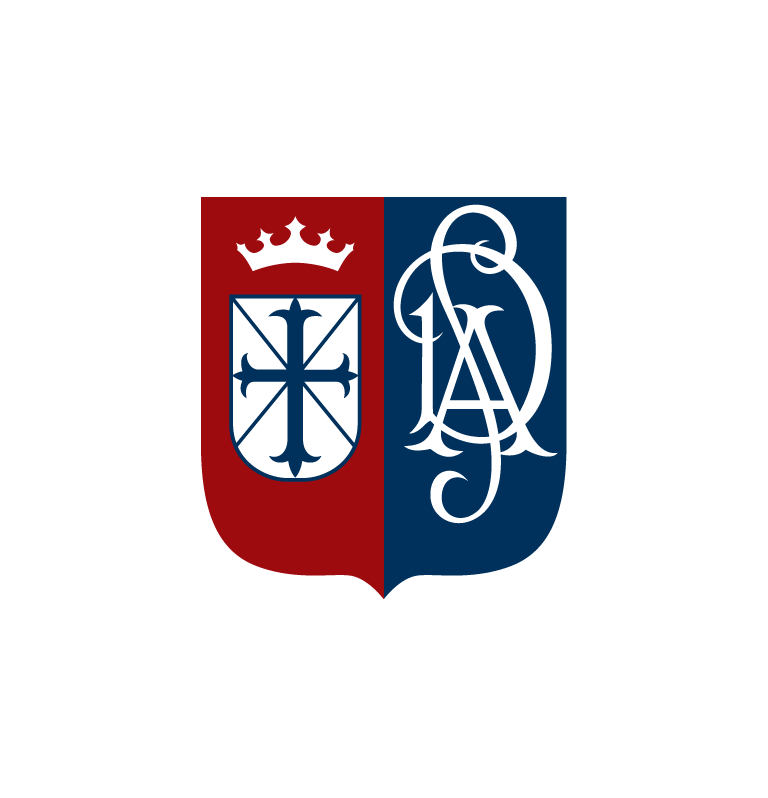

Saint Dominic Academy (SDA) is a private college-preparatory for girls in seventh through twelfth grades, located in Jersey City, in Hudson County, in the U.S. state of New Jersey. The school, which is situated within the Roman Catholic Archdiocese of Newark, and is administered by the Dominican Sisters of Caldwell, New Jersey, has been accredited by the Middle States Association of Colleges and Schools Commission on Elementary and Secondary Schools since 1991.

As of the 2023–24 school year, the school had an enrollment of 189 students and 20.9 classroom teachers (on an FTE basis), for a student–teacher ratio of 9:1. The school's student body was 32.3% (61) White, 25.4% (48) two or more races, 18.0% (34) Hispanic, 16.4% (31) Asian and 7.9% (15) Black.

== History ==
The school was founded in 1878 by a community of nuns from New York, with the objective to educate children of immigrants, primarily German, before moving to a sire on Bergen Avenue in 1915 and then on Bentley Avenue in 1929. On March 7, 1942, SDA moved to its present location on Kennedy Boulevard. In 1994, a new wing was open with new computer labs, science and language labs. The school celebrated its 135th birthday in the 2013–14 school year with the addition of grades 7 and 8. In 2015, Saint Dominic Academy received a generous donation of a building located on Fairmount Avenue in Jersey City. This building was once the Jersey City Women's Club and is now known as Siena Hall, which opened in April 2016 and is used for school-related events.

Saint Dominic Academy is a member of the New Jersey Association of Independent Schools.

== Academics ==
Certain minimum requirements have been established by the Middle States Association of Colleges and Schools and Saint Dominic Academy for graduation. These are expressed in terms of successful completion of specific courses and credits.

Graduation requirements:

- 4 years of English
- 4 years of Math (exceeds the NJ State standards)
- 3 years of History
- 3 years of Science
- 2 years of a World Language (Spanish and French)
- 4 years of Religious Studies
- 4 years of Physical Education and Drivers Education
- 1 semester of Art and Music
- 1 semester of Computer Literacy
- 4 electives
- Community service hours vary per grade level and are required for graduation

Academic Levels - College Preparatory/Honors/Advanced Placement:

- 68 College-preparatory (CP) courses
- 18 Honors level courses
- 14 Advanced Placement courses
- 200 Virtual High School courses
- 50 College Level courses earning credit from Saint Peter's University
- 4 College Level courses earning credit from Seton Hall University

== Physical education ==
Physical education courses are conducted at Saint Peter's University located just a few blocks away from the high school. Students have use of the university's gym/athletic facilities including fitness center, basketball and tennis courts, jogging track, and a competitive swimming pool.

== Athletics ==
The Saint Dominic Academy Blue Devils compete in the Hudson County Interscholastic League, which comprises public and private high schools in Hudson County and operates under the supervision of the New Jersey State Interscholastic Athletic Association. With 340 students in grades 10–12, the school was classified by the NJSIAA for the 2019–20 school year as Non-Public B for most athletic competition purposes, which included schools with an enrollment of 37 to 366 students in that grade range (equivalent to Group II for public schools).

The school's interscholastic sports include:

- Cross Country
- Soccer
- Tennis
- Volleyball
- Basketball
- Dance
- Track & Field
- Swimming
- Softball

The track team won the winter / indoor track Non-Public state championship in 2016.

The track team won the indoor relay Non-Public B title in 2018.

== Extracurricular activities ==
SDA hosts a range of after-school clubs. These clubs consist of a moderator and an executive board made up of seniors (normally) and are elected by the fellow members of that club. It is encouraged to join as many clubs as possible by the school. Some of the clubs that are run are:

- Anime Club
- Asian Interest Club
- Dominican Youth in Action Club
- Drama Club
- Glee Club and Dominoes
- Hospitality Club
- Liturgical Choir
- Math Club
- Metropolitan Club
- Mock Trial Club
- Multicultural-World Languages Club
- National Honor Society
- Peer Ministry Program
- Publications:
  - Elan Literary Magazine
  - The Trumpet (Newspaper)
  - Domenica (Yearbook)
- Student Council
- SOFAR (Student Organization for Animal Rights)
- Student Ambassador Club

== Notable alumni ==
- Dolores Lee (1935–2014), former pitcher who played from 1952 through 1954 in the All-American Girls Professional Baseball League.
