= Ercel F. Webb =

Ercel Franklin Webb (July 24, 1920 - December 21, 1999), was a clergyman, educator, colonel, civic leader and proponent of civil rights.

== Early life and education ==
Webb was born in Leaksville, North Carolina. the son of Charles W. Webb, a Baptist minister, and Mamie Morton Webb, a school teacher. He was raised in a religious family, which later moved to Philadelphia, Pennsylvania. He attended public schools and obtained his secondary education at Central High School. which, unusually, issued a B.A. degree to its graduates.

== Career ==
After his father's death, Webb worked as a part-time presser, as a golf course weeder, as a country club maintenance man, and as a receiving and shipping clerk. After hearing the call to preach, Webb was licensed by the Abyssinia Baptist Church of Philadelphia in 1941. He married, and to provide for his family, he worked at the Frankfurt Arsenal as a messenger, a millwright helper, a storage clerk, and a packer.

In 1944 Webb was ordained by the Kaighn Avenue Baptist Church of Camden, New Jersey, and became its assistant pastor. In December 1944, Webb assumed leadership of Monumental Baptist Church in Jersey City, New Jersey a small, struggling church.

Webb served as a chaplain for the New Jersey National Guard, beginning in 1949. He served in three commands of the 50th Armored Division and, from 1966 to 1971, was Division Chaplain. He spent 18 months in the Army Reserve, and then became State Chaplain at the Department of Defense, New Jersey in 1973 as a Colonel, retiring in 1976.

Webb commuted to Eastern Baptist College in St. Davids, Pennsylvania, receiving his A.B. and M.R.E. degrees in 1949. While there he initiated a "Rag and Paper Drive" to raise funds for educational scholarships for church members. The Eastern Baptist Theological Seminary awarded him the M. Div. degree in 1954, and conferred upon him an honorary Doctor of Divinity degree in 1966.

Webb undertook a Sunday radio ministry in the early 1950s. He organized a series of clubs within Monument Baptist Church. Under his leadership, Monument purchased a vehicle to transport the elderly to and from church, set up a retirement home for senior members and low rent apartments for members of the congregation. Bank accounts for babies, holiday baskets for large families, cheques to the senior members, summer camp sponsorships for youngsters and assistance with funeral costs were some of his initiatives. The church became financially sound and was able to contribute to many causes, including the American Baptist Convention, the National Baptist Convention, U.S.A., Inc., and a number of colleges and local and national organizations. Web received the "Edward H. Rhoades Award" from the American Baptist Convention for outstanding Ministry through the urban church.

Webb was a life member of the N.A.A.C.P., and served as President of the Jersey City Branch. He also served as Chairman of CANDO, the local O.E.O.'s anti-poverty program; Director of Project 25, St. Peter's College minority student program; and President of the American Baptist Churches of New Jersey. He was also given the United States of America Congressional Record House of Representatives Honor in 1980.

Webb worked as a teacher, guidance counselor, and vice-principal in Jersey City, Cranford, and Westfield, New Jersey. In 1975, Webb served as Assistant Superintendent of Schools for the public schools of Jersey City, New Jersey. He served on various boards including Fairmount Hospital of Jersey City, New Jersey; the St. Peter's College of Jersey City, New Jersey; Eastern Baptist College and Seminary of St. Davids, Pennsylvania; and Director of the Rutgers Minority Investment Company.

In the 1960s, Webb worked with Fr. Victor Yanatelli, president of St. Peter's University, to increase the enrollment of black students at St. Peter’s. The Concerned Black Citizens Alliance of Jersey City recognized him for his community service in 1975. In 1980, the St. Peter's Education Department honored Reverend Webb for his community and education work. He was given the "Gold Centennial Medallion", an award usually granted to Jesuits. St. Peters University presented him with an Honorary Degree in July 1985.

Webb retired from Monumental Baptist Church in January 1986. He continued to participate in the American Baptist Church Interim Pastor program preaching and teaching for another 10 years. He died on December 21, 1999.

== Posthumous honors ==
In September, 2000, the Ercel F. Webb Christian Education Center was named after him by Monumental Baptist Church. In January 2001, the Ercel F. Webb Plaza on the corner of Lafayette and Van Horne streets, was named after him. Dr. E.F. Webb School, PS 22, was renamed for him in June 2002. In July 2004, Lafayette Park was renamed Reverend Dr. Ercel F. Webb Park in his memory. An image of Reverend Webb is included in the "Lafayette Legends" history trail in the park. (May 2012)

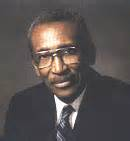
Educator in Jersey City Schools
