= Hudson County Interscholastic League =

High School sports association in New Jersey

The Hudson County Interscholastic League (formerly known as the Hudson County Interscholastic Athletic Association) is a New Jersey high school sports association operating under the jurisdiction of the New Jersey State Interscholastic Athletic Association (NJSIAA)and consisting of public and parochial high schools in Hudson County. The Hudson County Interscholastic Athletic Association was in hiatus for the 2009-10 school year, as all schools played in the temporary North Jersey Tri-County Conference, where they were joined with the non-Hudson County schools from the former Northern New Jersey Interscholastic League.

== Sports ==
- Fall Sports: Cross Country*, Football, Girls' Tennis, Soccer*, Volleyball
- Winter Sports: Basketball*, Swimming*, Track & Field*, Wrestling, Bowling*
- Spring Sports: Baseball, Boys' Tennis, Golf*, Softball, Track & Field*

(*)Sport is offered to both boys and girls.

== Schools ==
- Bayonne High School Bees, Bayonne
- William L. Dickinson High School Rams, Jersey City
- James J. Ferris High School Bulldogs, Jersey City
- Hoboken High School Redwings, Hoboken
- Holy Family Academy Falcons, Bayonne (Closed 2013)
- Hudson Catholic Regional High School Hawks, Jersey City
- Kearny High School Kardinals, Kearny
- Lincoln High School Lions, Jersey City
- Marist High School Royal Knights/Lady Knights, Bayonne (Closed 2020)
- Dr. Ronald E. McNair Academic High School Cougars, Jersey City
- Memorial High School Tigers, West New York
- North Bergen High School Bruins, North Bergen
- St. Anthony High School Friars, Jersey City (Closed 2017)
- Saint Dominic Academy Blue Devils, Jersey City
- St. Peter's Preparatory School Marauders, Jersey City
- Henry Snyder High School Tigers, Jersey City
- Union City High School Soaring Eagles, Union City
- University Academy Charter High School, Jersey City
- St. Mary's High School Ramblers, Jersey City (Closed 2011)
