= Jersey City Public Schools =

School district in Hudson County, New Jersey, US

Address
- 346 Claremont Avenue Jersey City, Hudson County, New Jersey, 07305; United States
- Coordinates: 40.714057°N 74.087308°W

District information
- Grades: PreK to 12
- Superintendent: Norma Fernandez
- Business administrator: Francine C. Luce
- Schools: 39
- Affiliation: Former Abbott district

Students and staff
- Enrollment: 29,113 (as of 2019–20)
- Faculty: 2,173.0 FTEs
- Student–teacher ratio: 13.4:1

Other information
- District Factor Group: B
- Website: www.jcboe.org
Ind.	Per pupil	District spending	Rank (*)	K-12 average	%± vs. average
1A	Total Spending	$22,273	95	$18,047	23.4%
1	Budgetary Cost	18,119	99	14,519	24.8%
2	Classroom Instruction	10,454	96	8,588	21.7%
6	Support Services	2,826	87	2,338	20.9%
8	Administrative Cost	1,773	101	1,448	22.4%
10	Operations & Maintenance	2,900	103	1,787	62.3%
13	Extracurricular Activities	152	14	263	−42.2%
16	Median Teacher Salary	68,360	76	62,707
Data from NJDoE 2013 Taxpayers' Guide to Education Spending. *Of K-12 districts with more than 3,500 students. Lowest spending=1; Highest=106

The Jersey City Public Schools is a comprehensive community public school district located in Jersey City, in Hudson County, in the U.S. state of New Jersey. The district is one of 31 former Abbott districts statewide that were established pursuant to the decision by the New Jersey Supreme Court in Abbott v. Burke which are now referred to as "SDA Districts" based on the requirement for the state to cover all costs for school building and renovation projects in these districts under the supervision of the New Jersey Schools Development Authority.

As of the 2019–20 school year, the district, comprising 39 schools, had an enrollment of 29,113 students and 2,173.0 classroom teachers (on an FTE basis), for a student–teacher ratio of 13.4:1.

The district had been classified by the New Jersey Department of Education as being in District Factor Group "B", the second lowest of eight groupings. District Factor Groups organize districts statewide to allow comparison by common socioeconomic characteristics of the local districts. From lowest socioeconomic status to highest, the categories are A, B, CD, DE, FG, GH, I and J.

The district was one of three districts in New Jersey (along with Newark Public Schools and Paterson Public Schools) under state intervention, which authorizes the state Commissioner of Education to intervene in curriculum functions. Calling the district a "total educational failure", the state took over control in 1989; In 2017, Jersey City became the first school district in New Jersey to regain full local control after having been under state intervention.

== Awards, recognition and rankings ==
Academy I Middle School was one of nine public schools recognized in 2017 as Blue Ribbon Schools by the United States Department of Education. Dr. Ronald E. McNair Academic High School was one of 18 schools statewide (and three public high schools) honored in 2018 by the National Blue Ribbon Schools Program, marking the second time the school was recognized by the program. Infinity Institute was honored by the National Blue Ribbon Schools Program in 2019, one of nine schools in the state recognized as Exemplary High Performing Schools.

McNair Academic High School was the second-ranked public high school in New Jersey out of 328 schools statewide in New Jersey Monthly magazine's September 2012 cover story on the state's "Top Public High Schools", after being ranked second in 2010 out of 322 schools listed. William L. Dickinson High School is the oldest high school in the city and James J. Ferris High School is represented by some of the top students of Jersey City who are members of the National Academy Foundation Magnet Programs. Academy I Middle School is one of the top middle schools in the country. Has been recognized with several achievements, including first place in the Lexus Environmental Challenge in 2008.

Dr. McNair Academic High School was named as a "Star School" by the New Jersey Department of Education, the highest honor that a New Jersey school can achieve, in the 1994–95 school year.

Alexander D. Sullivan School was recognized by Governor Jim McGreevey in 2003 as one of 25 schools selected statewide for the First Annual Governor's School of Excellence award.

== School uniforms ==
Students have been required to wear school uniforms since 1998.

== Schools ==
Schools in the district (with 2019–20 enrollment data from the National Center for Education Statistics) are:

=== Early childhood ===
- Anthony J. Infante Early Childhood Center
- Danforth Early Childhood Center
- Glenn Cunningham Early Childhood Center
- West Side Avenue Early Childhood Center

=== Elementary schools ===
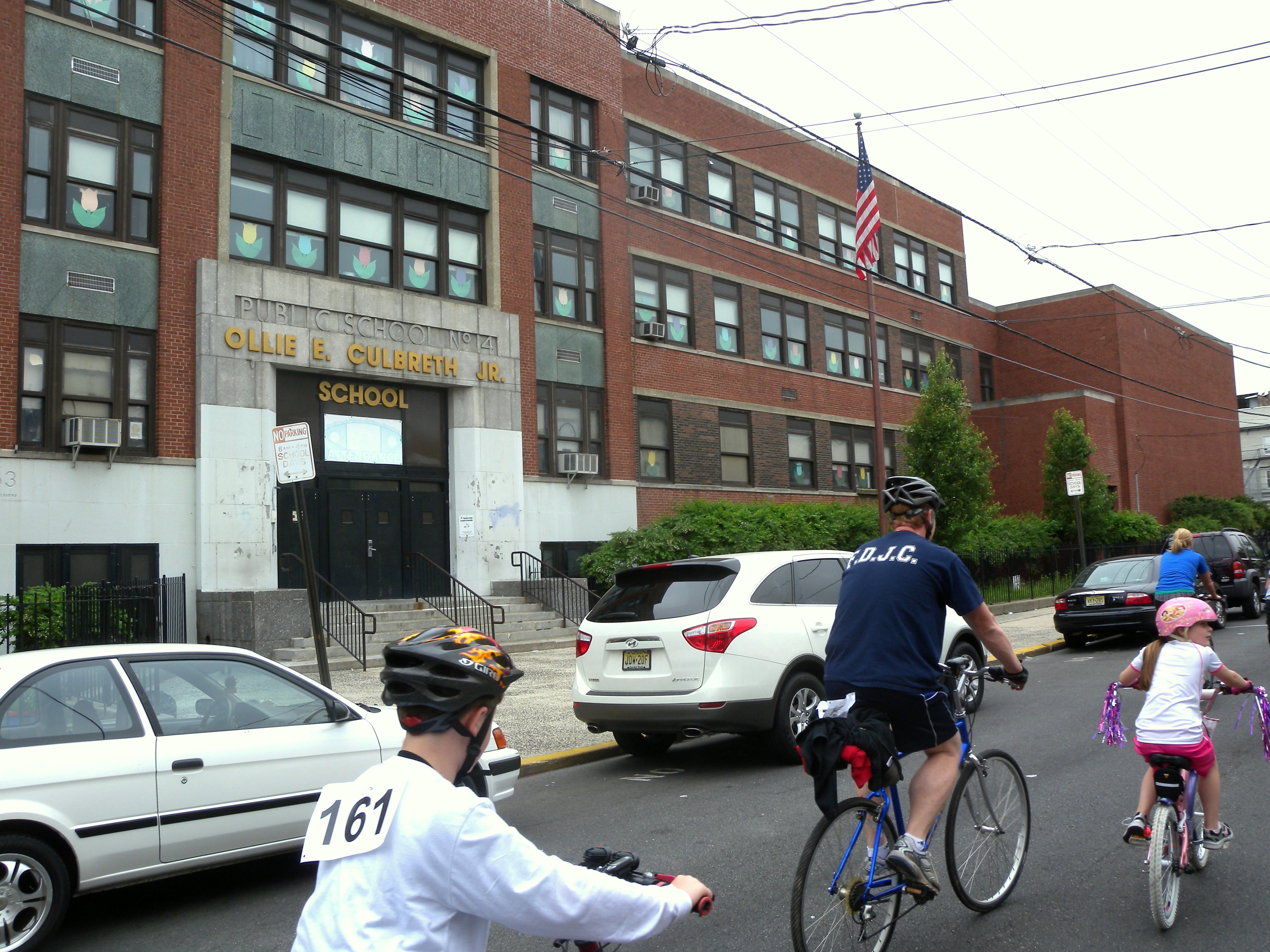
Ollie E. Culbreath Jr. P.S. 14

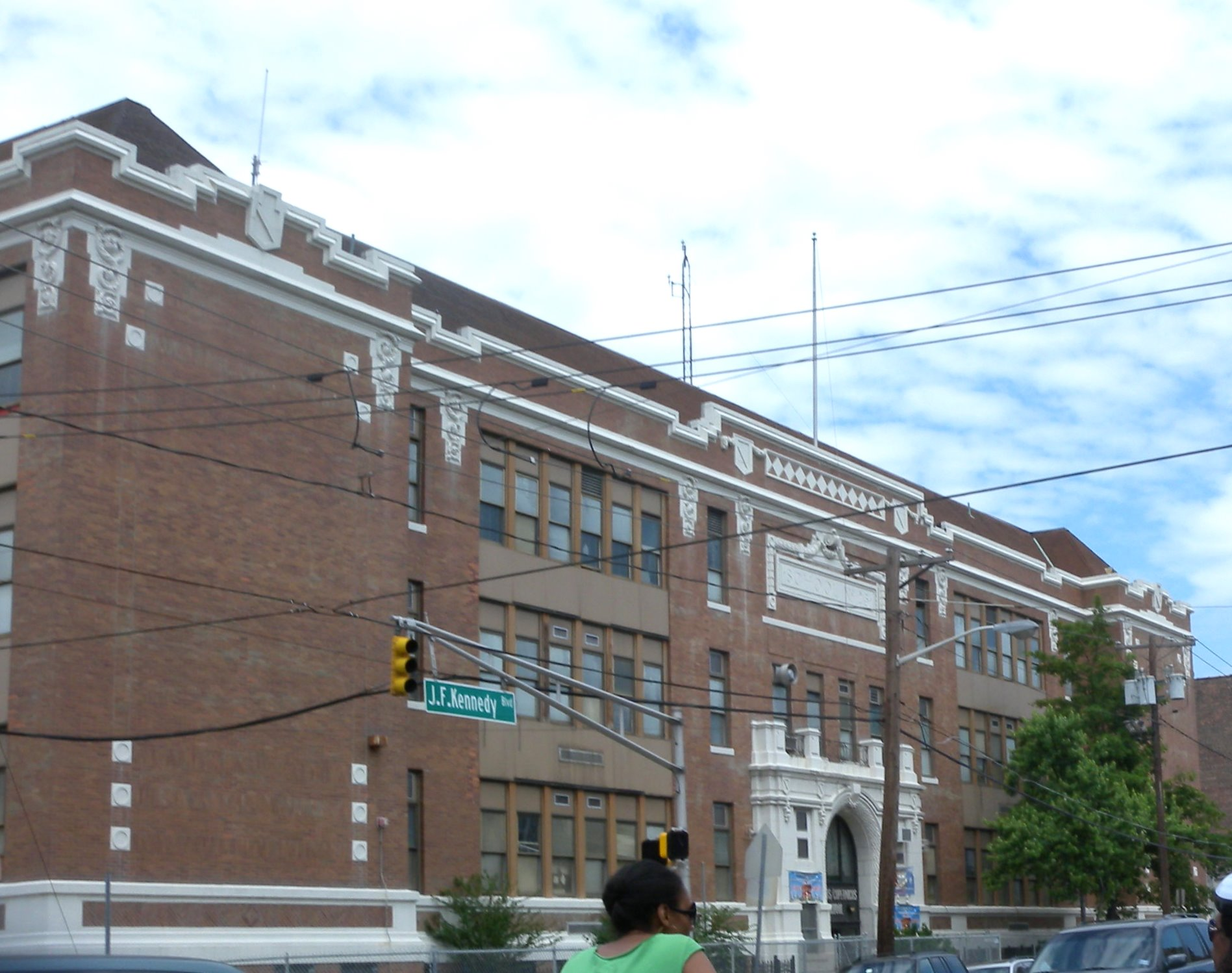
Copernicus P.S. 25

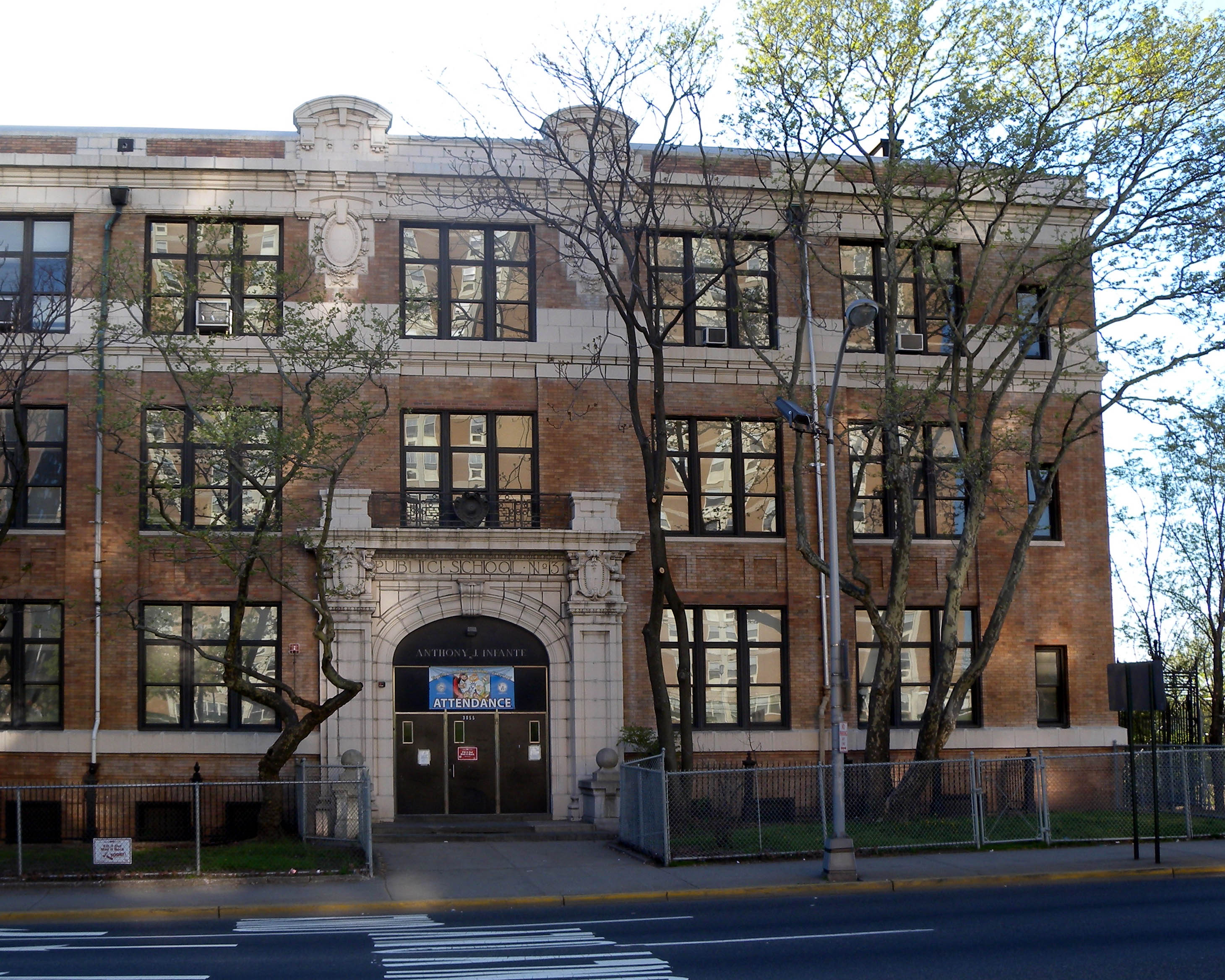
Anthony J. Infante P.S. 31

Elementary schools

Elementary schools in the district are:

- Frank R. Conwell School P.S. 3 (642 students; grades PreK-5)
  - Darren Mischel, principal
- Jotham W. Wakeman School P.S. 6 (664; PreK-5)
  - Joseph Apruzzese, principal
- Charles E. Trefurt School P.S. 8 (755; PreK-5)
  - Marisa Migliozzi, principal
- Julia A. Barnes School P.S. 12 (356; was PreK-8)
  - Don Howard, principal
- Cornelia F. Bradford School P.S. 16 (812; PreK-5)
  - Terry Watkins-Williams, principal
- Dr. Maya Angelou School P.S. 20 (689; PreK-5)
  - Hani Ileya, principal
- Rev. Dr. Ercel F. Webb School P.S. 22 (680; PreK-5)
  - Janine Anderson, principal
- Nicholas Copernicus School P.S. 25 (669; PreK-5)
  - Diane Pistilli, principal
- Patricia M. Noonan School P.S. 26 (467; PreK-5)
  - Alan LaMonica, principal
- Gladys Cannon Nunery School P.S. 29 (292; PreK-5)
  - Robert O'Connor, principal
- Alexander D. Sullivan School P.S. 30 (577; PreK-5)
  - Martha Osei-Yaw, principal
- Dr. Paul Rafalides School P.S. 33 (438; PreK-4)
  - Janeen Maniscalco, principal
- Gerard J. Dynes N.J. Regional Day School (73; Ungraded)
  - Colleen Williams, principal

=== Grammar schools ===
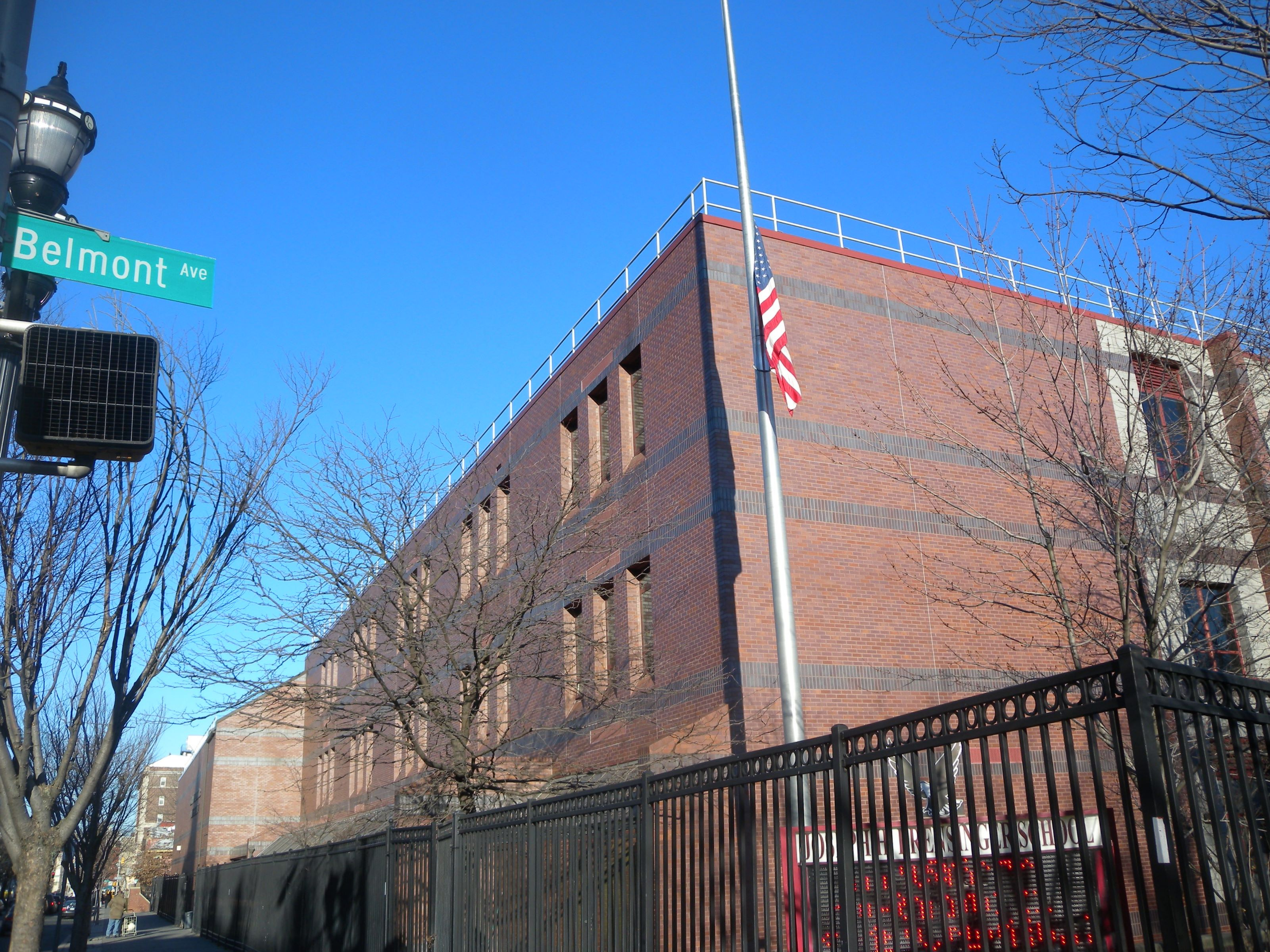
Joseph Brensinger School P.S. 17

Grammar schools in the district are:

- Dr. Michael Conti School P.S. 5 (721; PreK-8)
  - John Rivero, principal
- Dr. Martin Luther King Jr. School P.S. 11 (865; PreK-8)
  - Cleopatra Wingard, principal
- Ollie E. Culbreath Jr. School P.S. 14 (442; PreK-8)
  - Sharon Abbruscato, principal
- Whitney M. Young Jr. School P.S. 15 (645; PreK-8)
  - David Herman, principal
- Joseph H. Brensinger School P.S. 17 (1,283; PreK-8)
  - Robert Brower, principal
- Mahatma Gandhi School P.S. 23 (1,363; PreK-8)
  - Peter Mattaliano, principal
- Chaplain Charles Watters School P.S. 24 (762; K-8)
  - Rosalyn Barnes, principal
- Alfred E. Zampella School P.S. 27 (901; PreK-8)
  - Blanca Jackson, principal
- Christa McAuliffe School P.S. 28 (1,012; PreK-8)
  - Frank Borroto, principal
- President Barack Obama Community School P.S. 34 (445; PreK-8)
  - Janeen Maniscalco, principal
- Rafael De J. Cordero y Molina School P.S. 37 (814; PreK-8)
  - Derek Stanton, principal
- James F. Murray School P.S. 38 (795; PreK-8)
  - Sandra Jones, principal
- Dr. Charles P. DeFuccio School P.S. 39 (350; PreK-8)
  - Dawn Reynolds, principal
- Fred W. Martin Center for the Arts (481; PreK-8)
  - Glenda Jennings, principal

=== Middle schools ===
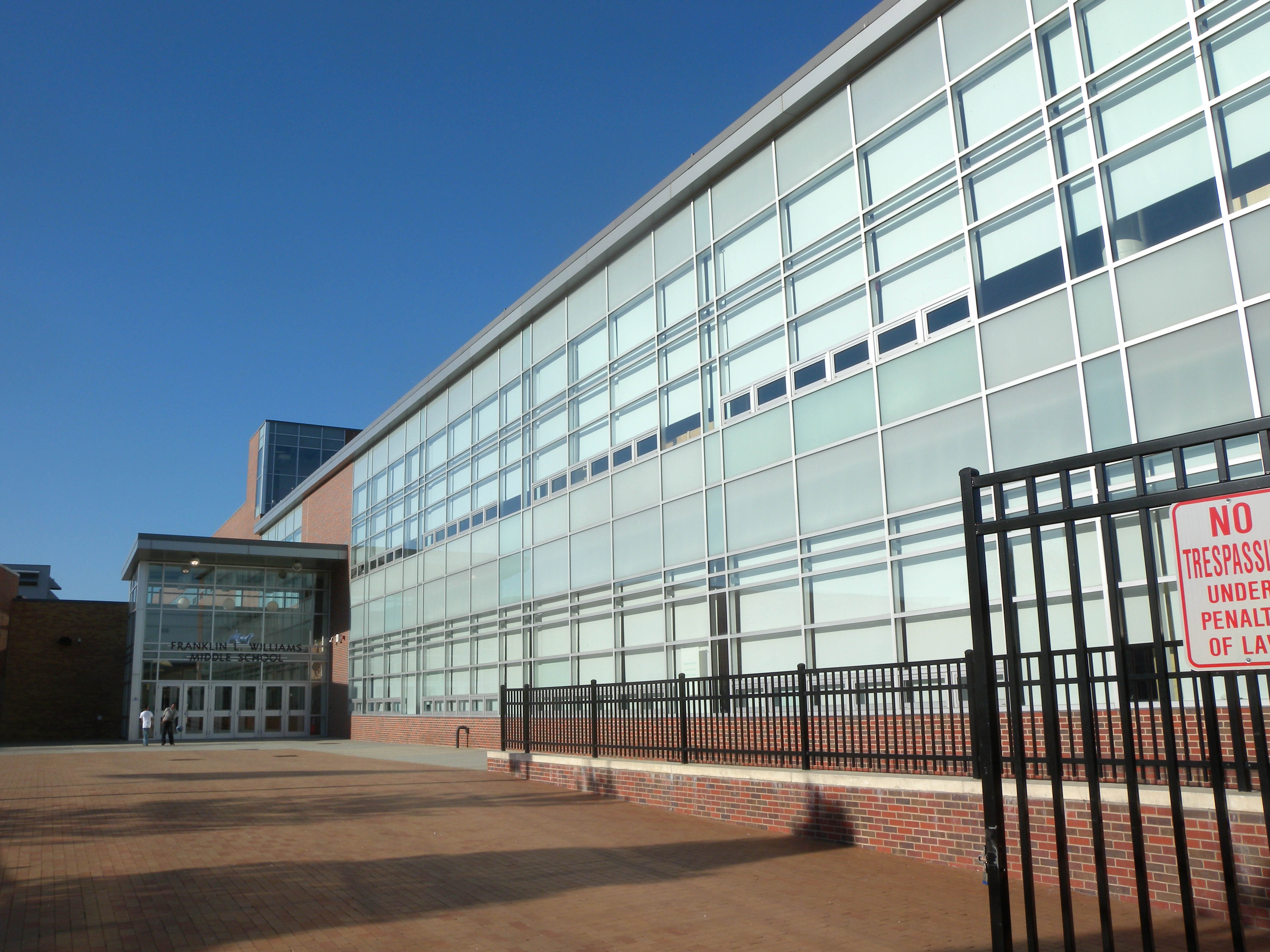
Franklin L. Williams M.S. 7

Middle schools in the district are:

- Frank R. Conwell M.S. 4 (767; 6–8)
  - Richard Stellato, principal
- Frank L. Williams M.S. 7 (896; 6–8)
  - Jaimie Barnaskas, principal
- Ezra L. Nolan M.S. 40 (303; 6–8)
  - Asael Salgado, principal
- Academy I Middle School (463; 6–8)
  - Fatima Corbin, principal

=== High schools ===
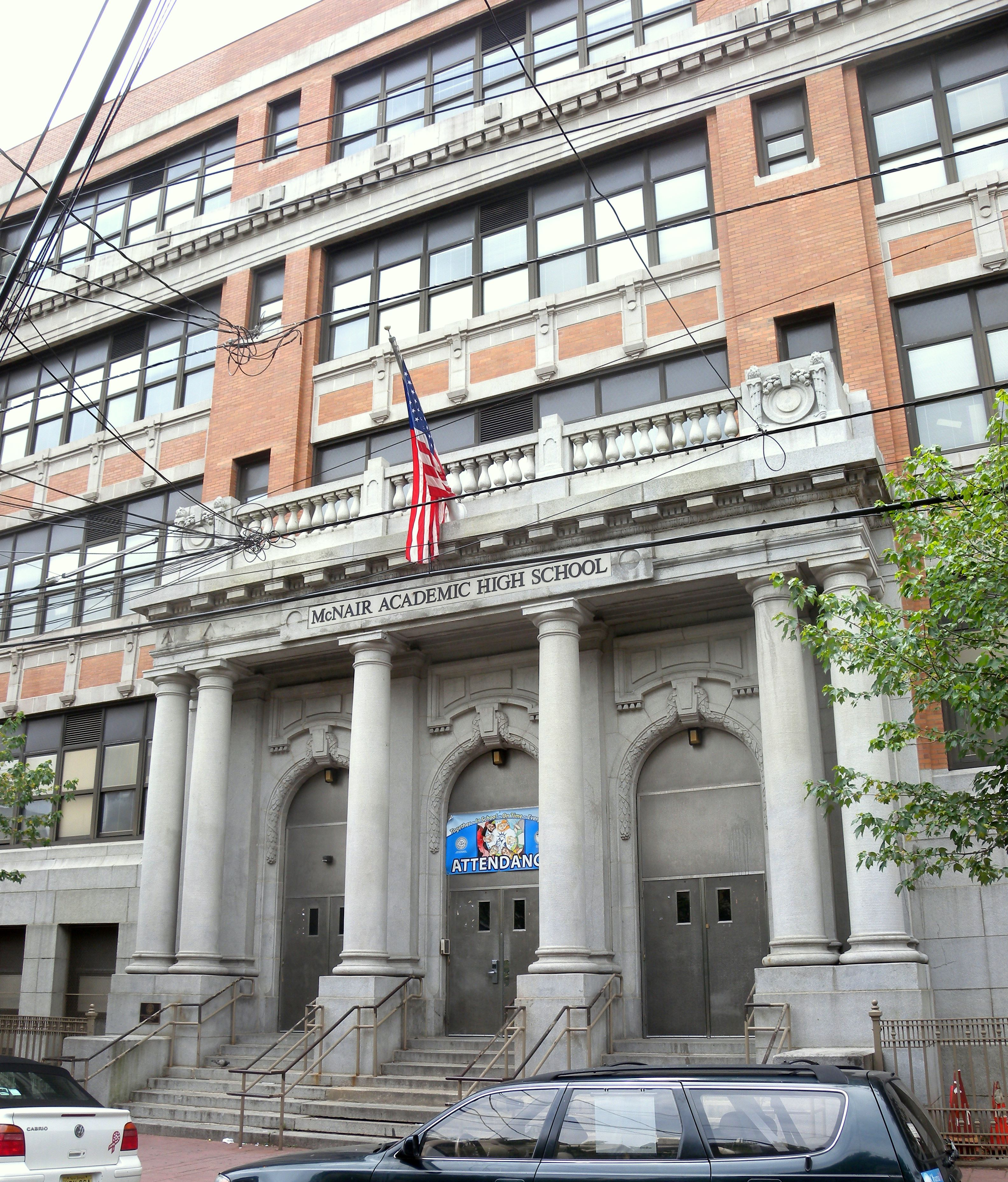
Dr. Ronald E. McNair Academic High School

High schools in the district are:

- William L. Dickinson High School Academy of the Sciences (1,812; 9–12)
  - Gekson Casillas, principal
- James J. Ferris High School Academy of International Enterprise (1,298; 9–12)
  - Deneen Alford, principal
- Infinity Institute (NA; 6–12)
  - Treniere Dobson, principal
- Innovation High School (309; 9–12)
  - Yvonne Waller, principal
- Liberty High School (231; 9–12)
  - Monica Grazilla, principal
- Lincoln High School Academy of Governance and Social Sciences (677; 9–12)
  - Chris Gadsden, principal
- Dr. Ronald E. McNair Academic High School (693; 9–12)
  - Tom Macagnano, principal
- Henry Snyder High School Academy of the Arts (708; 9–12)
  - Yvonne Waller, principal

== Administration ==
Core members of the district's administration are:

- Norma Fernandez, superintendent
- Francine C. Luce, acting business administrator and board secretary

== Board of education ==
The district's board of education is comprised of nine members who set policy and oversee the fiscal and educational operation of the district through its administration. As a Type II school district, the board's trustees are elected directly by voters to serve three-year terms of office on a staggered basis, with three seats up for election each year held (since 2013) as part of the November general election. The board appoints a superintendent to oversee the district's day-to-day operations and a business administrator to supervise the business functions of the district.

=== State intervention ===
The district was formerly one of three districts in New Jersey under "state intervention", which authorizes the commissioner of education to intervene in governance of a local public school district (and to intervene in the areas of instruction and program, operations, personnel, and fiscal management) if the commissioner has determined that a school district failed or was unable to take corrective actions necessary to establish a thorough and efficient system of education.

On October 4, 1989, the New Jersey Department of Education established a state-operated school district for Jersey City, appointing a state district superintendent to serve as the governing authority for the district instead of the board of education, and a new board of education was created and functioned as an advisory body. In 2005 the legislature disbanded state operation and created "state intervention". The Jersey City Board of Education assumed control of governance and finance on April 17, 2008. As of October 2010, although governance had been restored to local control in the form of an elected school board, the state district superintendent remained to manage personnel and curriculum functions. Local control for personnel was returned to the district in 2012. In July 2017, with Mussab Ali elected, Jersey City regained full local control with curriculum and programming being returned to the district.
