= University Academy Charter High School =

Charter school in Hudson County, New Jersey, US

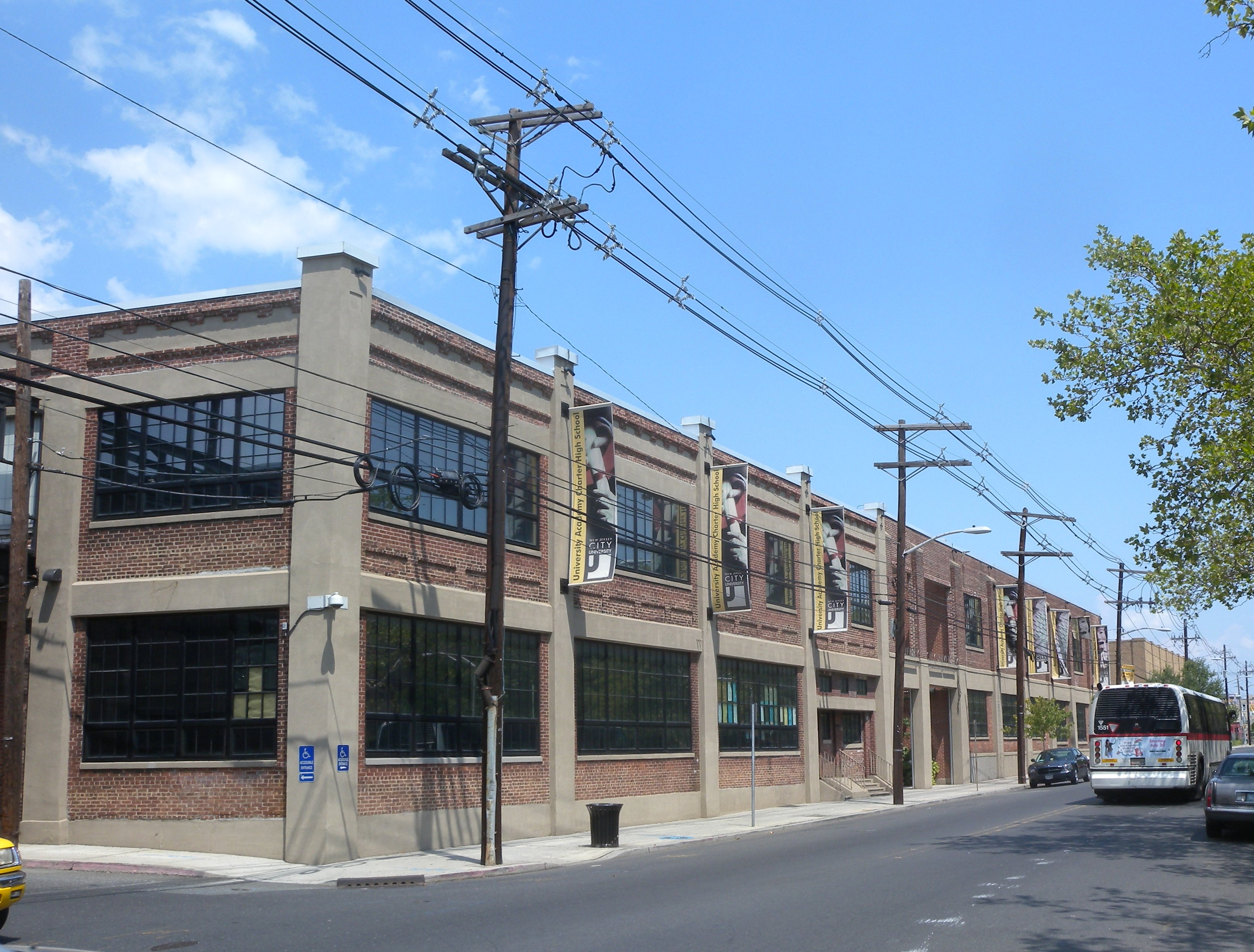

Location
- 275 West Side Avenue; Jersey City, Hudson County, New Jersey 07305; United States; 40.712302°N 74.091315°W

Information
- Type: Charter public high school
- Motto: Educating Tomorrow's Leaders Today
- Established: 2002
- NCES School ID: 340007300531
- Principal: Erie Lugo Jr.
- Faculty: 40.0 FTEs
- Grades: 9-12
- Enrollment: 429 (as of 2024–25)
- Student to teacher ratio: 10.7:1
- Colors: Green; Gold
- Athletics conference: Hudson County Interscholastic League
- Team name: Generals
- Newspaper: The Student Voice
- Website: www.uachs.org

University Academy Charter High School (often abbreviated to UACHS) is a four-year comprehensive public charter high school that serves students in ninth through twelfth grades from Jersey City, in Hudson County, in the U.S. state of New Jersey. The school opened in the 2002–03 school year and operates under the terms of a charter granted by the New Jersey Department of Education in 2001. Through its affiliation with Kean Jersey City, students who graduate from the school with a grade point average of 3.8 or higher are eligible to receive a four-year scholarship to Kean Jersey City.

As of the 2024–25 school year, the school had an enrollment of 429 students and 40.0 classroom teachers (on an FTE basis), for a student–teacher ratio of 10.7:1. There were 299 students (69.7% of enrollment) eligible for free lunch and 45 (10.5% of students) eligible for reduced-cost lunch.

They offer advanced placement classes includes AP Seminar, AP Bio, AP USA History I, AP Calculus AB, AP Computer Principles, and AP Lang. The average SAT scores are 921

== Awards, recognition and rankings ==
The school was the 283rd-ranked public high school in New Jersey out of 339 schools statewide in New Jersey Monthly magazine's September 2014 cover story on the state's "Top Public High Schools".

Based on the 2026-2027 school year, UACHS was ranked 279th in NJ out of 424 schools according to US News. The AP® participation rate at the school is 34%.

== Clubs ==
The extracurricular activities offered at UACHS include Art Club, Chess Club, Drama Club, Freshmen-Senior Class Committees, National Honor Society, Poetry Club, Student Government, The Student Voice Newspaper, and Yearbook.

The Student Voice Newspaper is the award-winning Journalism program at UACHS. In order to write for the Student Voice, students need to take Journalism I and Journalism II/III.

== Athletics ==
The University Academy Charter Generals compete in the Hudson County Interscholastic League, which consists of public and private high schools in Hudson County and operates under the auspices of the New Jersey State Interscholastic Athletic Association (NJSIAA). With 313 students in grades 10-12, the school was classified by the NJSIAA for the 2019–20 school year as Group I for most athletic competition purposes, which included schools with an enrollment of 75 to 476 students in that grade range.

Sports offered by the school include baseball, boys' and girls' basketball, fall cross country track, softball, spring track and winter indoor track.

== Administration ==
The school's principal is Erie Lugo. Core members of his administration include the three assistant principals.
