= Sable (building) =

Residential buildings in Jersey City, New Jersey

Sable Jersey City
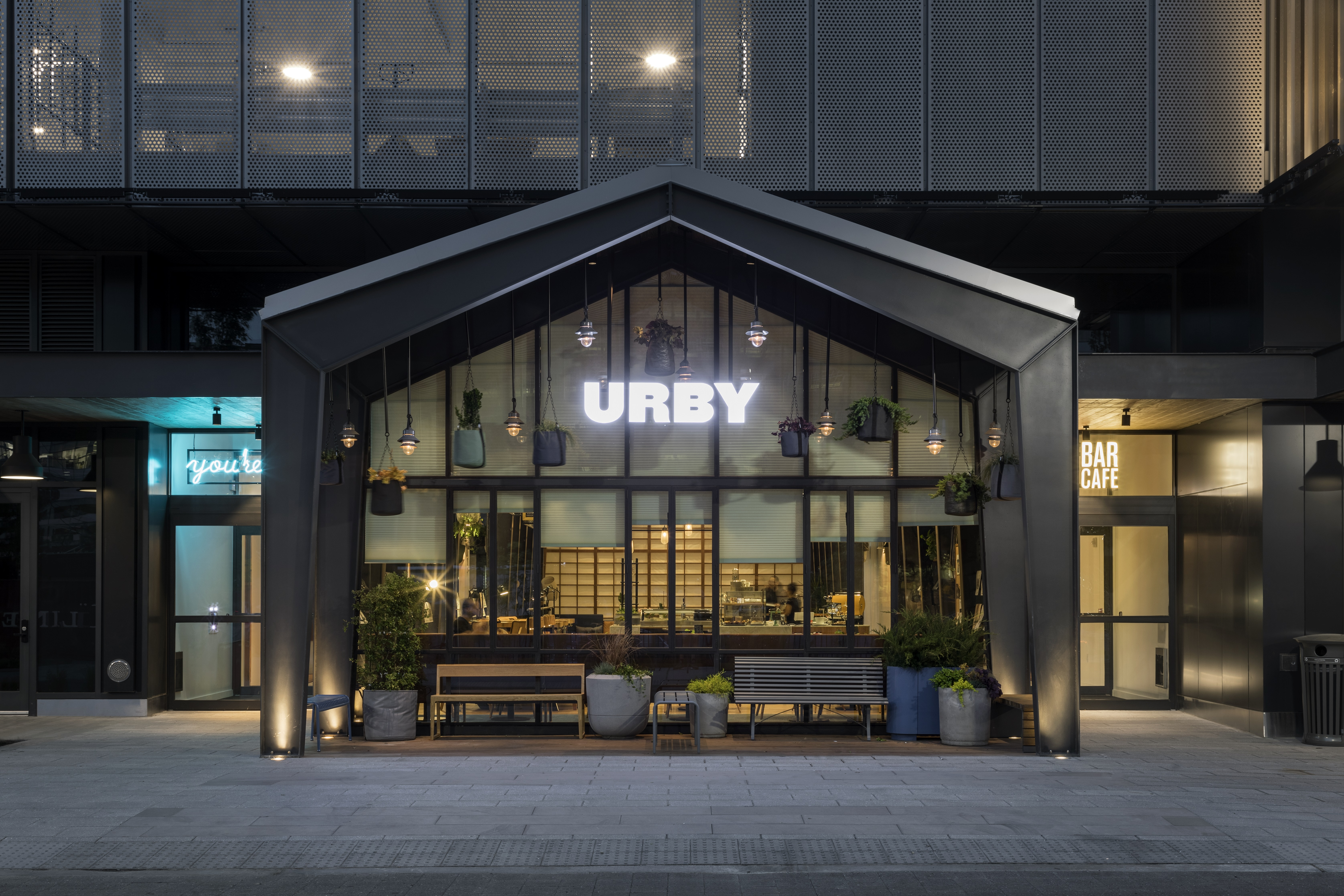

- Location within Hudson County, New Jersey
- Alternative names: URL Harborside, URBY Harborside

General information
- Status: Tower One: Complete; Tower Two: Approved; Tower Three: Approved
- Type: Residential
- Location: 200 Greene Street and 195 Hudson Street, Jersey City, New Jersey, United States
- Coordinates: 40.7202°N 74.0366°W
- Construction started: Tower One: 2014
- Completed: Tower One: 2017
- Renovation cost: Tower One: $2,280
- Owner: Veris Residential; Ironstate Holdings

Height
- Height: Tower One: 700 feet (210 m); Tower Two: 677 feet (206 m); Tower Three: 677 feet (206 m)

Technical details
- Floor count: Tower One: 70; Tower Two: 69; Tower Three: 69
- Floor area: 867,706 square feet (80,612.5 m^{2})
- Lifts/elevators: Tower One: 5

Design and construction
- Architect: Concrete
- Architecture firm: HLW International
- Structural engineer: DeSimone Consulting Engineers

Other information
- Number of rooms: Tower One: 762; Tower Two: 759; Tower Three: 847
- Parking: 500 parking spaces in all buildings

Website
- Official website

Sable Jersey City (formerly Urby) is a residential tower complex in downtown Jersey City, New Jersey, United States, known for its Jenga-like appearance. The first tower was proposed in 2012 as URL Harborside, and later renamed to Jersey City Urby. The construction of the first tower began in 2014, and completed in 2017. At 700 feet (210 m), the 69-story tower is the fourth tallest building in New Jersey, as well as in Jersey City as of May 2024. It overtook Ocean Resort Casino in Atlantic City for the title of second place when it was completed, but moved down to fourth after the constructions of 99 Hudson Street and Journal Squared Tower 2 respectively.

Originally planned to be a trio of three 69-story towers comprising 2,358 residential units, in 2022 a new proposal was approved which scaled back the Jenga appearance of the second and third towers. The new proposal has the two buildings being 677 feet with 1,606 residences, of which 164 hotel units are included. These units break down into 95 studios, 1,195 one-bedrooms, and 383 two bedrooms. The ground floor of the two towers would contain 32,000 square feet (3,000 m^{2}) of retail space split amongst five storefronts, of which one will face Hudson Street, two will face Bay Street, and two will face the pedestrian walkway facing Harborside 5. A 272-spot garage connecting the towers with valet parking is included, with an outdoor pool and landscaped garden hill on top the roof of the garage. Other amenities include a fitness center and indoor pool In July 2022, the city council gave approval of construction of two similar buildings in the complex.

In May 2024, Jersey City approved some slight changes to the development of Phase Two, which would reduce the number of units to 1,510 units, ground-level retail being reduced from five storefronts to four, some slight façade changes, and the addition of a dog park, outdoor seating with a café, and extra greenery. The plans for 164 hotel units and a 272-space valet parking garage with rooftop amenities remained unchanged. It is predicted that construction will begin in 2024, and that construction will begin with the base of the tower, followed by the construction of Tower Two, which will be followed by the construction of Tower Three once completed.

Similarly, in nearby Journal Square, a 317-unit, 25-story tower called Journal Square Urby was topped out in September 2023. The building will have similar amenities to the already existing tower complex in downtown.

== Sable (Jersey City Urby Tower One) ==
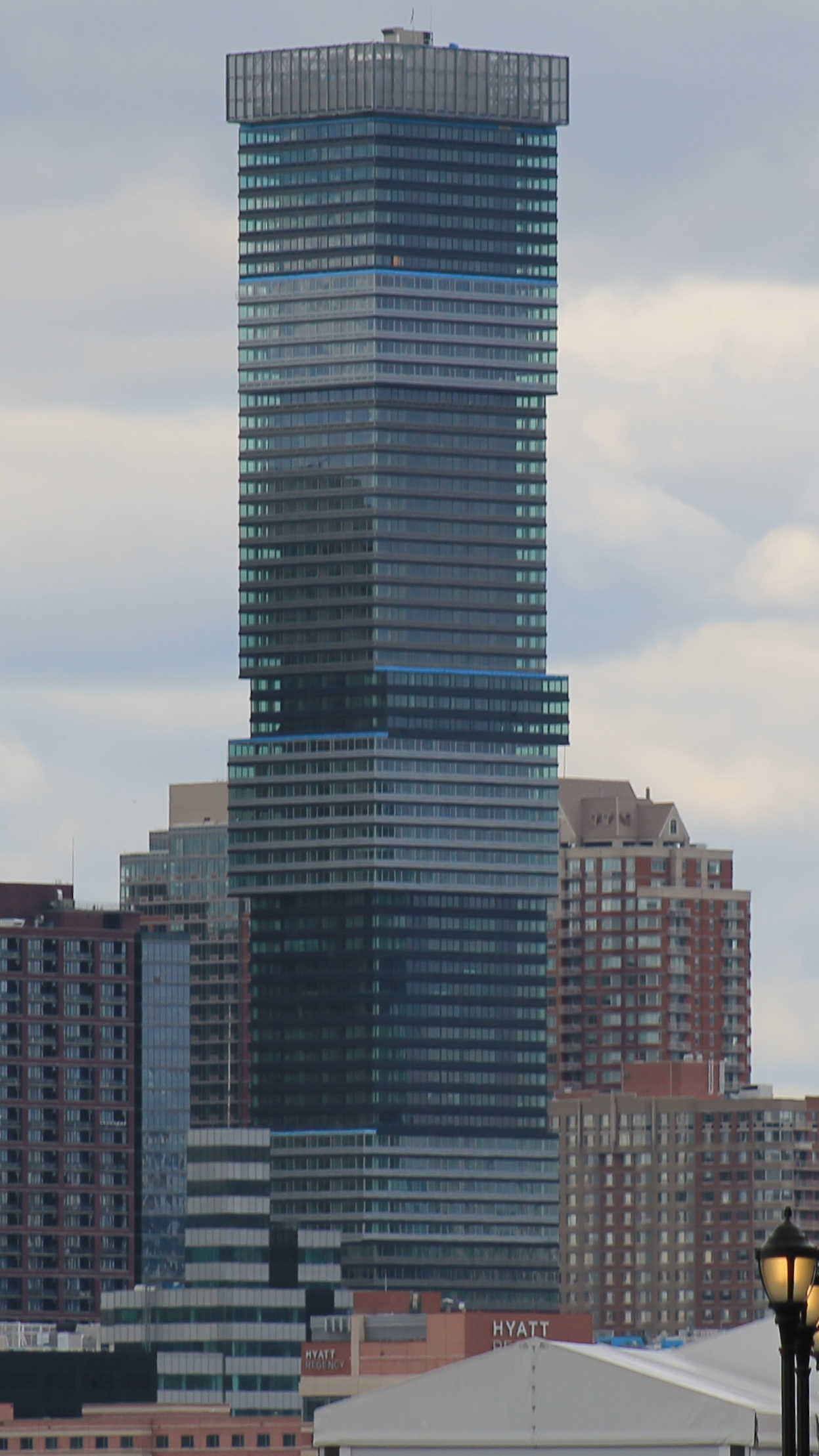
The Jersey City Urby Tower One seen from Lower Manhattan

There are three types of apartments within the tower, including studio, one bedroom, and two bedrooms. The apartments have large windows for full city views. They contain their own washer and dryer, built-in storage, full amenities within the kitchen, and air conditioning. Rentals range from $3,217to $5,460.

=== Amenities ===
Most of the building's shared social space features are located on the 9th floor. This includes a 24/7 concierge service, a heated swimming pool, a pool patio, a BBQ, a green space, a fully equipped gym with classes, outdoor lounges with fire pits, a post room, the Urby Kitchen (a space dedicated to classes and events), filtered water stations, cultural events, food tasting and local chef Q&As throughout the year, and currently has two restaurants, Canard Cafe and DOMODOMO sushi.

=== Transportation ===
The complex is within a 10-minute walk of three PATH stations: Exchange Place, Grove Street, and Newport. The Harborside Hudson-Bergen Light Rail (HBLR) station is directly in front of the building. The Harborside Ferry Terminal, which operates the NY Waterway ferry, is located right next to the HBLR station as well, in addition to the Paulus Hook ferry terminal being a 10-minute walk away. Two Academy Bus Lines routes stop nearby.

Additionally, several NJ Transit bus lines stop near Urby, all of which stop at Exchange Place.

=== Acquisition and Rebranding ===
On April 22, 2025, Veris Residential acquired Ironstate Holdings’ 15% stake in Jersey City Urby for $38.5 million. Veris Residential assumed complete ownership and management over the property, renaming the property to Sable. However, Ironstate Holding still has approvals to develop the second and third towers of Jersey City Urby.

== Urby Phase 2 and 3 ==
In 2022, new renderings were revealed for the second and third phase of Urby by Ironstate Development and Roseland Residential Trust, changing the design from the Jenga-like appearance to lack offsets and be more straight in appearance. The design kept the buildings at 69-stories and 677 feet (206 meters). These two towers were to consist of 1,606 residences, broken down into 95 studios, 1,128 one-bedrooms, and 383 two-bedrooms; as well as 164 hotel rooms, 32,000 square feet of retail space split amongst five storefronts. Two of the storefronts will be facing Harborside Park, which is getting improvements, including a pedestrian walkway which opposes Harborside Plaza 5. The new towers will be connected by a finished rooftop. On the second floor, there will be a fitness center and an indoor pool. The third phase would also include a 272-space parking garage, including a valet-option. The roof of the parking garage will contain an outdoor pool and a landscaped garden hill.

In May 2024, the Jersey City Planning Board approved the second and third phases of Urby. The final, approved version of the complex reduced the number of units to 1,510. Renderings showed a dog park, outdoor seating and cafes, and greenery .

In December 2025, the surface parking lot at 200 Greene Street was closed permanently, with early excavation work beginning at the site.

In August 2026, the second phase of Urby, being branded as 201 Hudson by Urby, obtained a $277 million loan to begin construction on the site of the former parking lot. This tower will include 748 units, 10,000 square feet of retail space, and a 272-car parking garage.

== See also ==
- List of tallest buildings in New Jersey
- List of tallest buildings in Jersey City
- List of tallest buildings in the United States
