= List of tallest buildings in New Jersey =

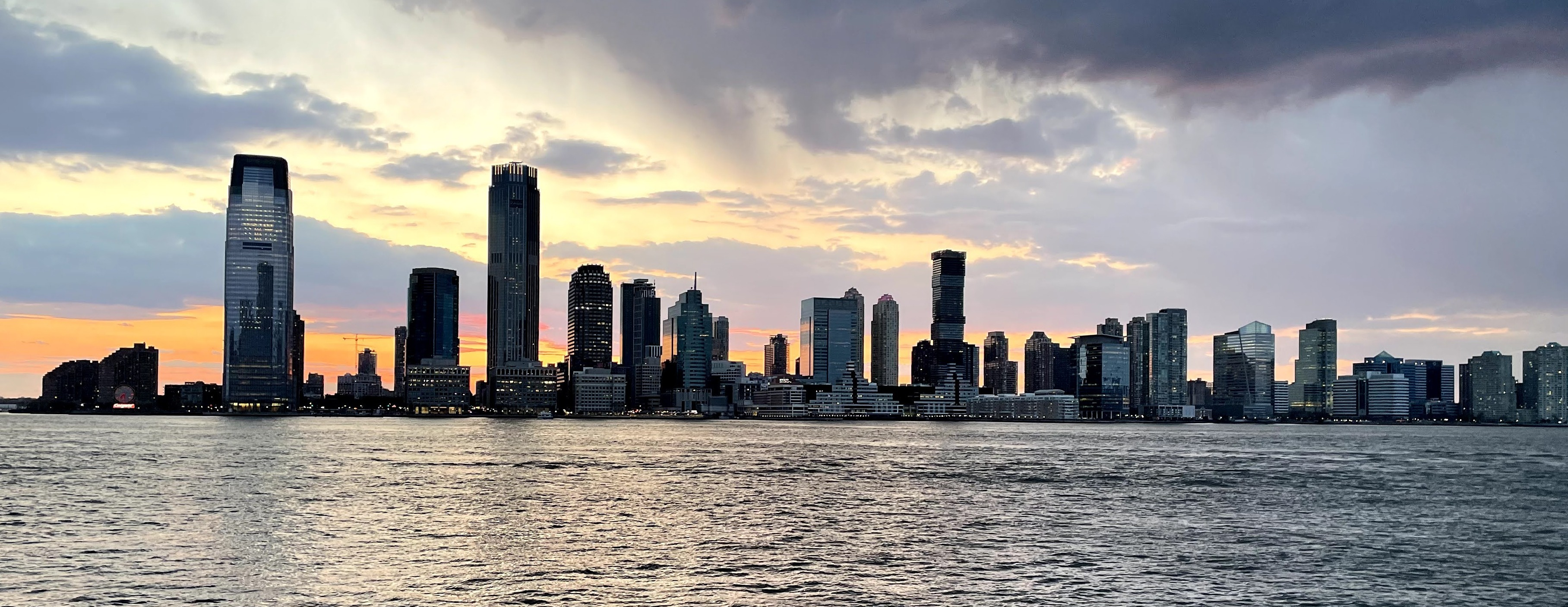
Skyline of Jersey City on the Hudson Waterfront in 2021

This list of tallest buildings in New Jersey ranks skyscrapers and high-rises in the U.S. state of New Jersey by height. The tallest building in New Jersey is the 79-story 99 Hudson Street in Jersey City, which topped out at 900 feet (274 m) in September 2018. It is the 51st-tallest building in the United States, as well as the 15th-tallest residential building in the United States. The 42-story 30 Hudson Street, known widely as the Goldman Sachs Tower, which rises 781 feet (238 m) at Exchange Place in Jersey City is the state's tallest commercial building. It is also the 97th-tallest building in the United States. The tallest building in New Jersey outside Jersey City is the 57-story Ocean Resort Casino, which rises 709 feet (216 m) in Atlantic City and ranks as the second-tallest casino tower in the United States.

The vast majority of skyscrapers and high-rises in New Jersey are concentrated in Jersey City, Newark, Atlantic City, Fort Lee, and North Hudson. Amongst New Jersey cities, Jersey City has the most buildings exceeding 330 feet (100 m) in height at 39 buildings, followed by Atlantic City with 12 buildings, Newark with 9 buildings, and Fort Lee with 7 buildings.

The first skyscraper in New Jersey was the Firemen's Insurance Building, built in 1910 in Newark. The first skyscraper boom in New Jersey largely began in the 1920s and 1930s, largely concentrated in Newark, with the construction of various iconic buildings such as the National Newark Building and the Military Park Building. Newark had a small high-rise building boom in the 1960s to 1970s, followed by decades of little construction. Although Jersey City's first skyscraper, the Labor Bank Building, was built in 1928, the city did not have much of a skyline presence until a small building boom in the late 1980s and early 1990s. In the 2000s, Jersey City's building boom truly kicked off. Jersey City and Newark have experienced large building booms in the 2010s, particularly toward the end of the decade, both of which have continued into the present. Atlantic City has had two distinct building booms, the first occurring in the 1980s and the second in the 2000s, both largely consisting of the construction of casino buildings.

== Tallest buildings ==
This list ranks New Jersey skyscrapers that stand at least 300 feet (91 m) tall, based on standard height measurement. This includes spires and architectural details but does not include antenna masts. The "Year" column indicates the year in which a building was completed.

† Was the State's tallest building upon completion
Indicates was the tallest buildings that have been architecturally topped out but not opened

=	Denotes two or more buildings which equal in height ranking

Rank	Name	Image	Height ft (m)	Floors	Year	City	Notes
1	99 Hudson Street		900 ft (270 m)	79	2019	Jersey City	41st-tallest building in the United States. Tallest building in New Jersey. Tallest building constructed in New Jersey in the 2010s. Tallest residential building in the United States outside of New York City and Chicago.
2	30 Hudson Street †		781 ft (238 m)	42	2004	Jersey City	81st-tallest building in the United States. Tallest building constructed in New Jersey in the 2000s.
3	Journal Squared Tower 2		754 ft (230 m)	70	2021	Jersey City	Third-tallest building in Jersey City. Tallest building constructed in New Jersey in the 2020s. Part of the three-tower Journal Squared complex.
4=	One Journal Square Tower I		710 ft (216 m)	64	Expected 2026	Jersey City	Part of the two-tower One Journal Square complex.
4=	One Journal Square Tower II		710 ft (216 m)	64	Expected 2026	Jersey City	Part of the two-tower One Journal Square complex.
6	Sable		700 ft (210 m)	70	2016	Jersey City	Formerly Jersey City Urby until April 2025. Fourth-tallest building in Jersey City.
7	Ocean Resort Casino		709 ft (216 m)	57	2012	Atlantic City	Tallest building In Atlantic City since 2012 and the second-tallest casino tower in the United States. Tallest building in New Jersey outside of the New York metropolitan area. Formerly known as Revel.
8	55 Hudson		650 ft (198 m)	59	2027	Jersey City	Part of a two-tower complex with 50 Hudson Street.
9	Journal Squared Tower 3		639 ft (195 m)	60	2024	Jersey City	Part of the three-tower Journal Squared complex.
10	420 Marin Boulevard		634 ft (193 m)	60	Expected 2026	Jersey City	Phase 2 of the Hudson Exchange development plan. Topped off on May 26, 2025
11	Haus25		626 ft (191 m)	57	2022	Jersey City	
12	Journal Squared Tower I		574 ft (175 m)	54	2017	Jersey City	Part of a three-tower complex.
13	505 Summit		556 ft (169 m)	53	Expected 2026	Jersey City	
14	101 Hudson Street †		548 ft (167 m)	42	1992	Jersey City	Tallest building constructed in New Jersey in the 1990s.
15	235 Grand Street		537 ft (164 m)	45	2019	Jersey City	
16	Trump Plaza		532 ft (162 m)	55	2008	Jersey City	
17	Newport Tower †		531 ft (162 m)	36	1991	Jersey City	
18=	70 Columbus		530 ft (160 m)	50	2015	Jersey City	
18=	90 Columbus		530 ft (160 m)	50	2018	Jersey City	
20	Harrahs Waterfront Tower		525 ft (160 m)	45	2008	Atlantic City	Second tallest building in Atlantic City and outside the New York metropolitan area.
21	Exchange Place Center †		515 ft (157 m)	30	1989	Jersey City	Tallest building constructed in New Jersey in the 1980s.
22=	Monaco North		509 ft (155 m)	47	2011	Jersey City	
22=	Monaco South		509 ft (155 m)	47	2011	Jersey City	
24=	70 Greene Street		500 ft (150 m)	50	2010	Jersey City	
24=	77 Hudson Street		500 ft (150 m)	50	2009	Jersey City	
26=	The Modern 1		496 ft (151 m)	47	2014	Fort Lee	Tallest buildings in Fort Lee and among the tallest twin buildings worldwide
26=	The Modern 2		496 ft (151 m)	47	2018	Fort Lee	Tallest buildings in Fort Lee and among the tallest twin buildings worldwide
28	Trump Bay Street		484 ft (148 m)	50	2016	Jersey City	
29	Harborside Plaza 5		480 ft (146 m)	34	2002	Jersey City	
30	Hard Rock Hotel and Casino North Tower		470 ft (143 m)	45	2008	Atlantic City	Third-tallest building in Atlantic City and outside the New York metropolitan area.
31	National Newark Building †		465 ft (142 m)	34	1931	Newark	Tallest building constructed in New Jersey in the 1930s and tallest building in Newark since 1931. Was tallest building in New Jersey for 58 years, having held the title between 1931 and 1989.
32	The Water Club at Borgata		457 ft (139 m)	38	2008	Atlantic City	Fourth-tallest building in Atlantic City and outside the New York metropolitan area.
33	Halo Tower 1		454 ft (138 m) -	38	Expected 2026	Newark	Second tallest building constructed in Newark.
34=	M2 at Marbella		450 ft (137 m)	38	2016	Jersey City	
34=	Southampton Apartments		450 ft (137 m)	36	2000	Jersey City	
34=	Atlantic Apartments		450 ft (137 m)	36	1998	Jersey City	
34=	Riverside Apartments		450 ft (137 m)	33	1998	Jersey City	
34=	East Hampton Apartments		450 ft (137 m)	33	1999	Jersey City	
39	Vantage Tower Two		448 ft (137 m)	45	2021	Jersey City	
40	Eleven 80 †		448 ft (137 m)	35	1930	Newark	Third-tallest building in Newark.
41	The Palisades		445 ft (136 m)	41	2001	Fort Lee	
42	The Ellipse		445 ft (136 m)	41	2017	Jersey City	
43	Crystal Point		436 ft (133 m)	42	2009	Jersey City	
44	Borgata Hotel and Casino		431 ft (131 m)	43	2003	Atlantic City	Fifth-tallest building in Atlantic City and outside the New York metropolitan area.
45	Hard Rock Hotel & Casino		429 ft (131 m)	41	1990	Atlantic City	Sixth-tallest building in Atlantic City and outside the New York metropolitan area.
46	Marbella Apartments		427 ft (130 m)	40	2003	Jersey City	
47	Galaxy Towers		415 ft (126 m)	44	1971	Guttenberg	Tallest building in North Hudson and in Hudson County outside of Jersey City
48=	Liberty View Towers East		380 ft (116 m)	36	2003	Jersey City	
48=	Liberty View Towers West		380 ft (116 m)	36	2003	Jersey City	
50=	Bally's Atlantic City		375 ft (114 m)	37	1989	Atlantic City	Seventh-tallest building in Atlantic City and outside the New York metropolitan area.
50=	The One		375 ft (114 m)	36	2015	Jersey City	
52	Prudential Plaza Building		374 ft (114 m)	24	1960	Newark	Tallest building constructed in New Jersey in the 1960s. Fourth-tallest building in Newark.
53	Camden City Hall		371 ft (113 m)	18	1931	Camden	Tallest building in Camden since 1931. Tallest building in the Philadelphia metropolitan area that is located outside of Philadelphia. Tallest building in South Jersey outside of Atlantic City.
53=	Iconiq 777		371 ft (113 m) (estimated (Note: CTBUH has an estimated height based on floor count and the height of similar buildings.))	33	2022	Beyer Blinder Belle, architects. Residential building also known as 777 McCarter Highway. Developed by Boraie in partnership with Shaquille O'Neal	
55	The Claridge		370 ft (110 m)	24	1930	Atlantic City	
56	The Stonehenge		369 ft (112 m)	34	1967	North Bergen	
57	Parker Imperial		366 ft (112 m)	30	1973	North Bergen	
58=	80 Park Plaza		360 ft (110 m)	26	1980	Newark	
58=	Ocean Club East Tower		360 ft (110 m)	34	1984	Atlantic City	
58=	Ocean Club West Tower		360 ft (110 m)	34	1984	Atlantic City	
61=	One Gateway Center		359 ft (109 m)	30	1971	Newark	Tallest building constructed in New Jersey in the 1970s.
61=	Riviera Towers		359 ft (109 m)	38	1965	West New York	
63	Athena Tower		353 ft (108 m)	33	2007	Jersey City	
64	Zion Towers		351 ft (107 m)	28	1969	Newark	
65	Grove Pointe		349 ft (106 m)	29	2007	Jersey City	
66	Resorts Rendezvous Tower		348 ft (106 m)	27	2004	Atlantic City	
67=	The Plaza		347 ft (106 m)	32	1975	Fort Lee	
67=	The Colony		347 ft (106 m)	32	1972	Fort Lee	
69	The Versailles		346 ft (105 m)	29	1964	West New York	
70	The Flagship Resort		337 ft (103 m) (estimated)	32	1988	Atlantic City	
71=	River Ridge		336 ft (102 m)	31	1985	Fort Lee	
71=	Century Towers		336 ft (102 m)	31	1981	Fort Lee	
73	Provost Square		335 ft (102 m)	38	2015	Jersey City	
74=	Aquablu		331 ft (101 m)	32	2009	Jersey City	
74=	Atlantic Palace Suites		331 ft (101 m)	31	1986	Atlantic City	
76	Newark Legal Center		329 ft (100 m)	20	2000	Newark	
77=	One Newark Center		326 ft (99 m)	22	1992	Newark	Grad Associates, architects. Tallest building constructed in Newark in the 1990s. Home of Seton Hall University School of Law.
77=	American Insurance Company Building (Ruth Bader Ginsburg Hall)		326 ft (99 m)	16	1930	Newark	John H. & Wilson C. Ely, architects. Converted to residences by Rutgers University–Newark; renamed in 2023 to honor Ruth Bader Ginsburg
79	Airport Traffic Control Tower at Newark Liberty International Airport	NewarkAirportControlTower 01	325 ft (99 m)	n/a	2002	Newark	
80	Tower West		323 ft (98 m)	27	1962	West New York	
81=	Cosmo 440; 440 Elizabeth Avenue		313 ft (95 m)	25	1970	Newark	Formerly known as Carmel Towers; residential building vacant since 2011. As of 2024 the building was undergoing rehabilitation.
81=	Prudential Tower		313 ft (95 m)	20	2015	Newark	Kohn Pedersen Fox, architects. Tallest building constructed in Newark in the 2010s.
83=	Overlook Terrace North		311 ft (95 m)	26	1969	West New York	
83=	Overlook Terrace South		311 ft (95 m)	26	1969	West New York	
85=	Horizon Towers North		304 ft (93 m)	28	1968	Fort Lee	
85=	Horizon Towers South		304 ft (93 m)	28	1968	Fort Lee	
87=	Harrahs Bayview Tower		302 ft (92 m)	25	2002	Atlantic City	
87=	Wyndham Skyline Tower		302 ft (92 m)	30	2004	Atlantic City	
89	Prudential Building		300 feet (91 m)	21	1942	Newark	Tallest building constructed in Newark in the 1940s.

== Tallest under construction, approved, proposed ==
=== Under construction ===
Buildings that are under construction in New Jersey and are planned to rise at least 300 feet (91 m).

Name	Height ft / m	Floors	Year* (est.)	City	Notes
Harborside 8	708 (216)	68	–	Jersey City	Part of the larger Harborside complex.
Harborside 4	685 (209)	55	2029	Jersey City	Part of the larger Harborside complex.
Imperial Tower	637 ft (194 m)	56	2027	Jersey City	Originally approved as a 35 story building. Construction started on foundation and lower floors then paused. In 2025, approved to expand to 56 stories with structural modifications to the existing five-story podium.
808 Pavonia Avenue Building 1	560 ft (171 m)	49	2027	Jersey City	
Summit Tower	489 ft (149 m)	41	2028	Newark	Within the Four Corners Historic District between the Newark Paramount Theatre and Prudential Center.
Metropolitan Tower	308 ft (94 m) -	22	2025 (projected)	Newark	Demolition of old Metropolitan Building on Washington Street, facade of which was originally planned to be incorporated into new tower.

=== Tallest approved ===
Buildings that are approved in New Jersey and are planned to rise at least 300 feet (91 m).

Name	Height ft / m	Floors	Year* (est.)	City	Notes
Avalon Tower	722 ft (220 m)	70		Jersey City	Would be the fourth tallest building in both New Jersey and Jersey City upon completion.
30 Journal Square	718 ft (219 m)	68		Jersey City	Developer granted five year approval extension in 2022.
Jersey City Urby Tower 2	677 ft (206 m)	69		Jersey City	Part of the three-tower Urby complex.
Jersey City Urby Tower 3	677 ft (206 m)	69		Jersey City	Part of the three-tower Urby complex.
72 Montgomery Street	648 ft (198 m)	56		Jersey City	
808 Pavonia Avenue Building 4	620 ft (189 m)	55		Jersey City	
Halo Tower 2	619 ft (189 m)	53	2027/2028	Newark	Between Teachers Village and the Essex County Judicial Complex, part of the three-tower complex on a six-story base, it would be the tallest building in Newark if completed.
900 Broad Street	610 ft (186 m)	53		Newark	At Broad and Green streets across from Newark City Hall. Originally proposed in 2019 as 51 stories but was approved as 61 story tower to have 552 units.
Harborside 9	607 ft (185 m)	57		Jersey City	Part of the larger Harborside complex.
Halo Tower 3	587 ft (179 m)	52	2027/2028	Newark	Part of the three-tower complex on a six-story base, it would be the second-tallest building in Newark if the second tower is completed.
Mulberry Pointe	586 ft (179 m)	51		Newark	Opposite Government Center at 315 Mulberry Street, two residential towers with over 1,000 rental units.
Arc Tower	520 ft (158 m)	45	2026/2027	Newark	571 Broad Street between Military Park and Harriet Tubman Square
Nova Towers	487 ft (148 m)	42		Newark	Twin towers approved in the Teachers Village neighborhood at Halsey and William streets. Both towers are set to have 712 units.
560 Marin Boulevard		59		Jersey City	Approved in 2017. Developer requested for approval extension until September 2022.
580 Marin Boulevard		57		Jersey City	Approved in 2017. Developer requested for approval extension until September 2022.
500 Summit		42		Jersey City	Rights to develop were being bid for in April 2024.
NB Plaza	450 ft (137 m)	45		New Brunswick	
HELIX H-3	500 ft (152 m)	42		New Brunswick	Part of the three-tower HELIX complex
20 Atlantic Street	431 ft (131 m)	40		Newark	Four 40-story towers along McCarter Highway clustered around Atlantic Street station east of former IDT Corporation headquarters, which would also be converted to residences and retail space.
Paramount Tower	310 ft (94 m)	28		Newark	Residential buildings within Four Corners Historic District at site of the disused Newark Paramount Theatre, incorporating its facade.
Iberia Phase One	303 ft (92 m)	30		Newark	East of Newark Penn Station in the Ironbound; Phase one consist of two 30 story towers with "town square" pedestrian plaza.

=== Tallest proposed ===
Buildings that are proposed in New Jersey and are planned to rise at least 300 feet (91 m).

Name	Height ft / m	Floors	Year* (est.)	City	Notes
110 Town Square Place	420 ft (128 m)	40		Jersey City	Part of the Newport PATH Station
48 Branford Place	347 ft (106 m)	32		Newark	Proposed 32 story 441 residential Tower near Teachers Village.
Westview		30, 39, 55, 56		Jersey City	Four tower complex

== Tallest building in each city ==
This list ranks the tallest building in each city that stand at least 300 feet (91 m).

Rank	Name	Height ft / m	Floors	Year* (est.)	City	Notes
1	99 Hudson Street	900 ft (270 m)	79	2019	Jersey City	41st-tallest building in the United States. Tallest building in New Jersey. Tallest building constructed in New Jersey in the 2010s. Tallest residential building in the United States outside of New York City and Chicago.
2	Ocean Resort Casino	709 ft (216 m)	57	2012	Atlantic City	Tallest building In Atlantic City since 2012 and the second-tallest casino tower in the United States. Tallest building in New Jersey outside of the New York metropolitan area. Formerly known as Revel.
3=	The Modern 1	496 ft (151 m)	47	2014	Fort Lee	Tallest buildings in Fort Lee and among the tallest twin buildings worldwide
3=	The Modern 2	496 ft (151 m)	47	2018	Fort Lee	Tallest buildings in Fort Lee and among the tallest twin buildings worldwide
5	National Newark Building	465 ft (142 m)	34	1931	Newark	Tallest building constructed in New Jersey in the 1930s and tallest building in Newark since 1931. Was tallest building in New Jersey for 58 years, having held the title between 1931 and 1989.
6	Galaxy Towers	415 ft (126 m)	44	1971	Guttenberg	Tallest building in North Hudson and in Hudson County outside of Jersey City
7	Camden City Hall	371 ft (113 m)	18	1931	Camden	Tallest building in Camden since 1931. Tallest building in the Philadelphia metropolitan area that is located outside of Philadelphia. Tallest building in South Jersey outside of Atlantic City.
8	The Stonehenge	369 ft (112 m)	34	1967	North Bergen	
9	Riviera Towers	359 ft (109 m)	38	1965	West New York	

== Timeline of tallest buildings ==
Years tallest	Name	Image	Height ft / m	Floors	Year completed	City	Notes
1910–1923	Firemen's Insurance Building		205 ft (62 m)	19	1910	Newark	
1923–1926	165 Halsey Street (Bamberger Building)		226 ft (69 m)	14	1923	Newark	
1926–1930	Military Park Building		266 ft (81 m)	21	1926	Newark	
1930–1931	Eleven 80		448 ft (137 m)	35	1930	Newark	
1931–1989	National Newark Building		465 ft (142 m)	34	1931	Newark	Holds the record for the longest title of tallest building in New Jersey, holding it for 58 years.
1989–1991	Exchange Place Center		490 ft (149 m)	30	1991	Jersey City	
1991–1992	Newport Tower		531 ft (162 m)	36	1992	Jersey City	
1992–2004	101 Hudson Street		548 ft (167 m)	42	1992	Jersey City	
2004–2019	30 Hudson Street		781 ft (238 m)	42	2004	Jersey City	Tallest non-residential building in New Jersey.
2019–present	99 Hudson Street		900 ft (274 m)	79	2018	Jersey City	41st-tallest building in the United States. Tallest building constructed in New Jersey in the 2010s. Tallest residential building in the United States outside of New York City and Chicago.

== See also ==
- List of tallest buildings in Atlantic City
- List of tallest buildings in Camden
- List of tallest buildings in Fort Lee
- List of tallest buildings in Jersey City
- List of tallest buildings in New Brunswick
- List of tallest buildings in Newark
- List of tallest buildings in New York City
- List of tallest buildings in North Hudson
