= Colgate Clock (Jersey City) =

American advertising clock facing the Hudson River

Coordinates: 40°42′43.3″N 74°02′02″W

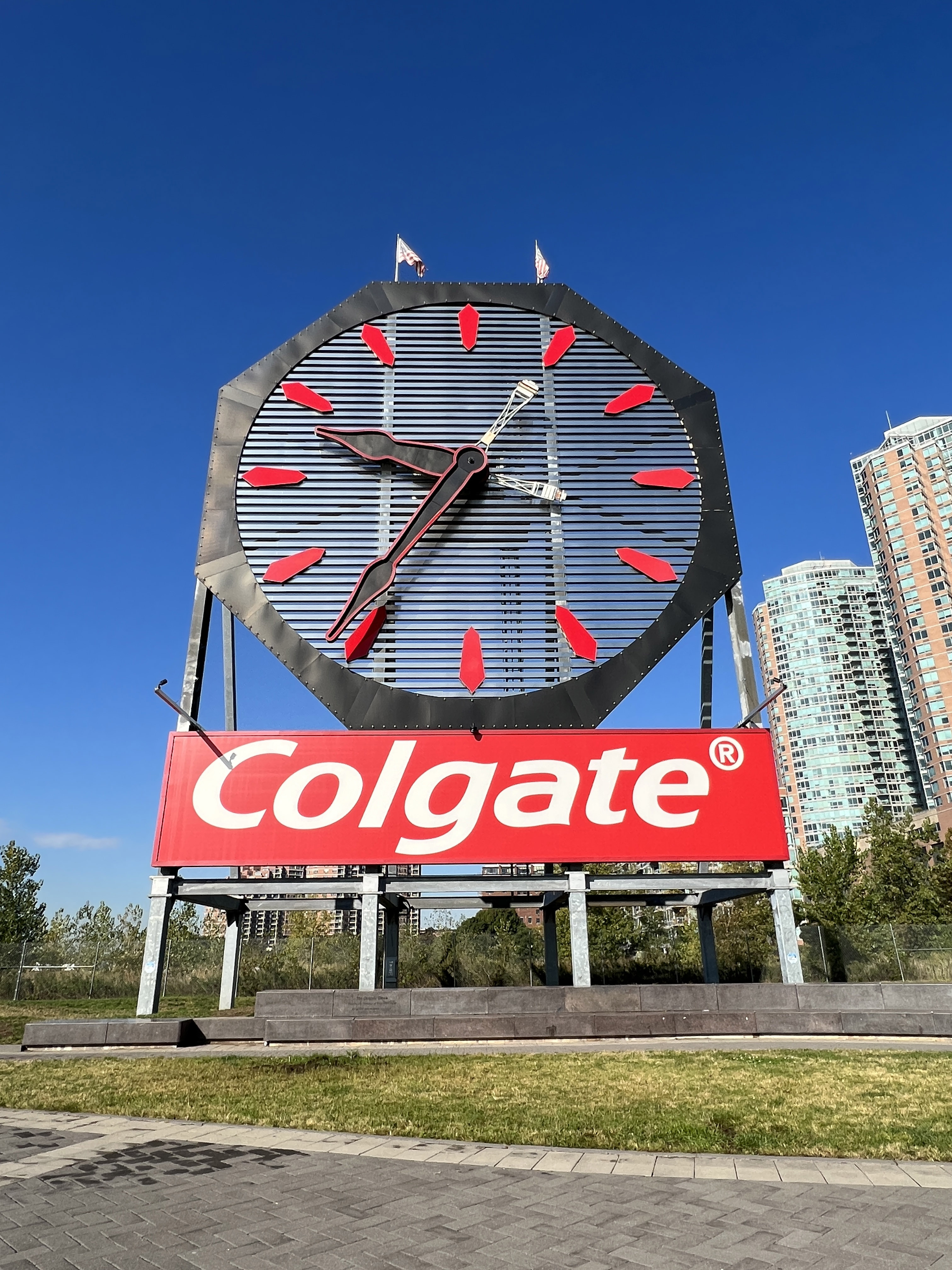
The clock on a morning

The Colgate Clock is an octagonal clock facing the Hudson River near Exchange Place in Jersey City, New Jersey. The clock has a diameter of 50 feet (15 m). It was located atop what was once the headquarters of Colgate-Palmolive until 1985, when it was moved to a ground-level location 1,300 feet (400 m) south of that building, which was demolished and replaced with the Goldman Sachs Tower.

== History ==
The Colgate Clock once perched atop the Colgate plant at 85-99 Hudson Street in Jersey City, New Jersey. This clock was built in 1924 to replace an earlier clock designed by Colgate engineer Warren Davey and constructed by the Seth Thomas Clock Company for Colgate's centennial in 1906. After it was replaced, the earlier clock was relocated to a Colgate factory in Clarksville, Indiana. The Jersey City clock was maintained by John A. Winters from the 1930s until his retirement in 1976.

As of 2005, the Colgate Clock stands on an otherwise empty lot. The other buildings in the complex were demolished in 1985 when Colgate left. The lot is located along the Hudson River waterfront and the clock itself is 100 metres (330 ft) south of the Goldman Sachs Tower, once the tallest skyscraper in the state of New Jersey. The construction of that building in the early 2000s forced a relocation of the clock southward. At that time, the size of the Colgate advertisement attached to it was reduced to comply with the Hudson River No Billboard law, and Goldman Sachs agreed to maintain the clock.

The clock is a mandatory reporting point for flights below Class B airspace in the Hudson River VFR corridor.

In 2013, the clock was refurbished, outfitted with LED lights, and reinstalled on the waterfront near the Goldman-Sachs tower.

== Gallery ==
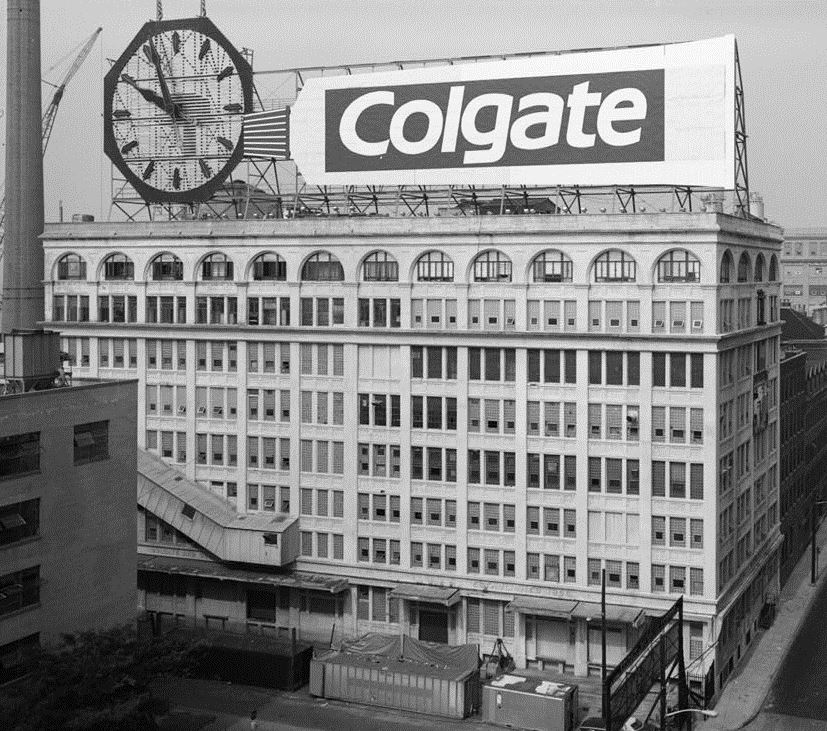
The original location of the clock

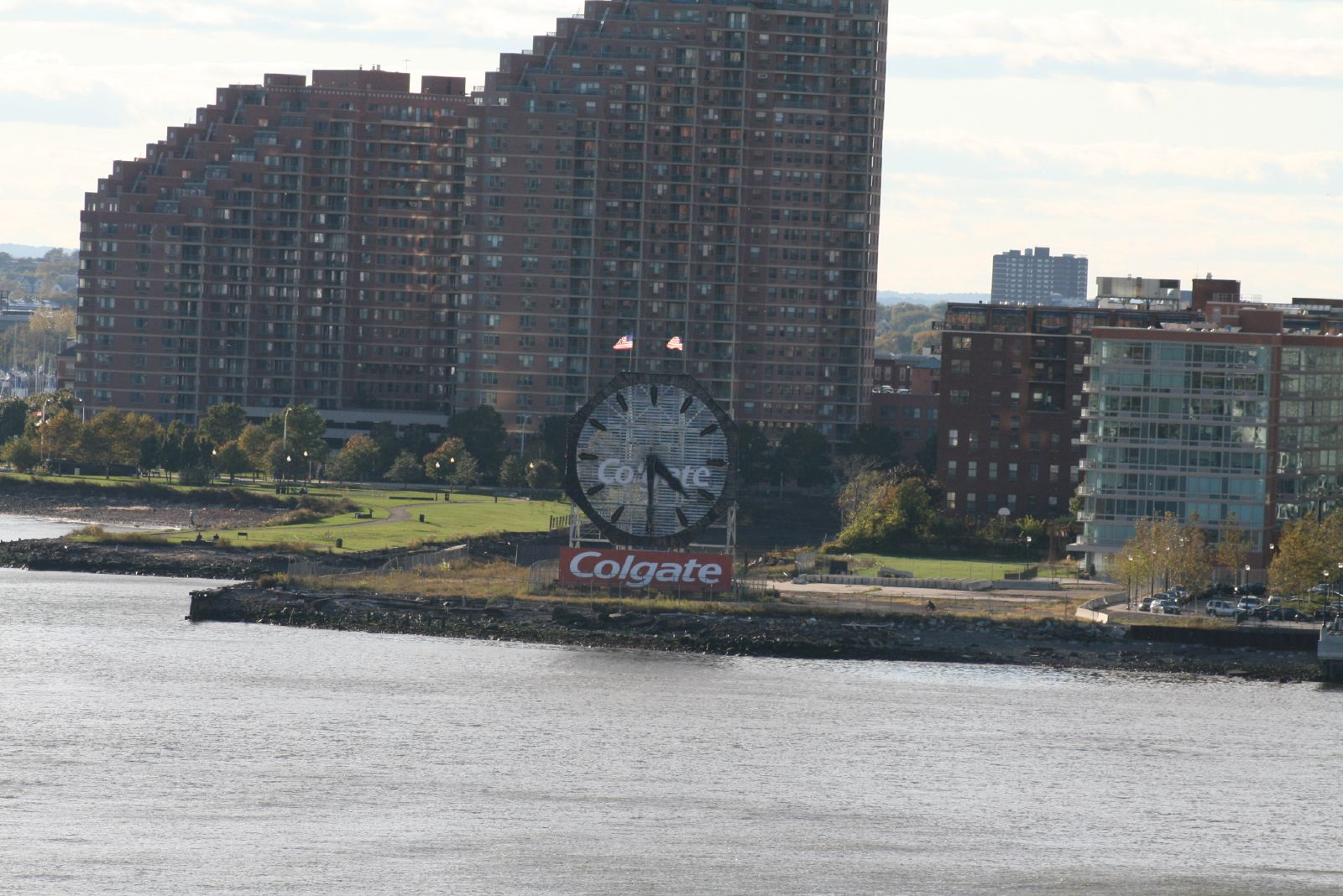
The clock in 2007

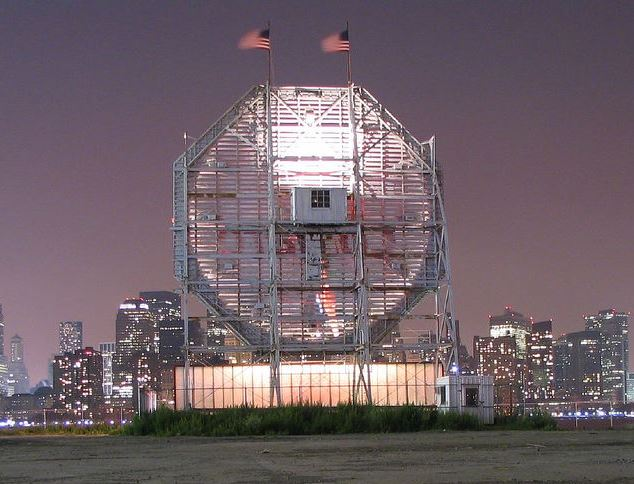
The rear of the clock, with Lower Manhattan in the background

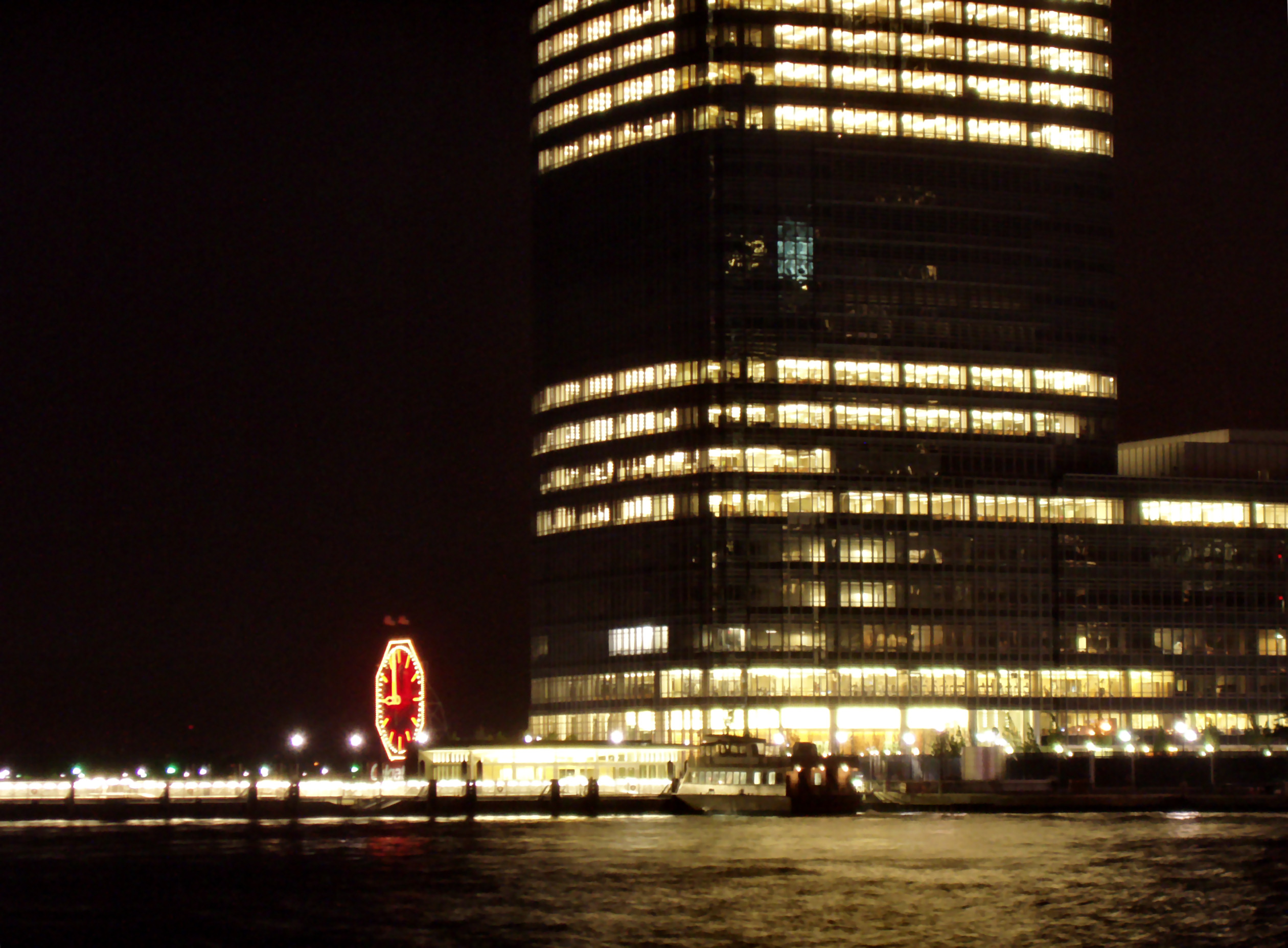
The clock at night, with the Goldman Sachs Tower in the foreground

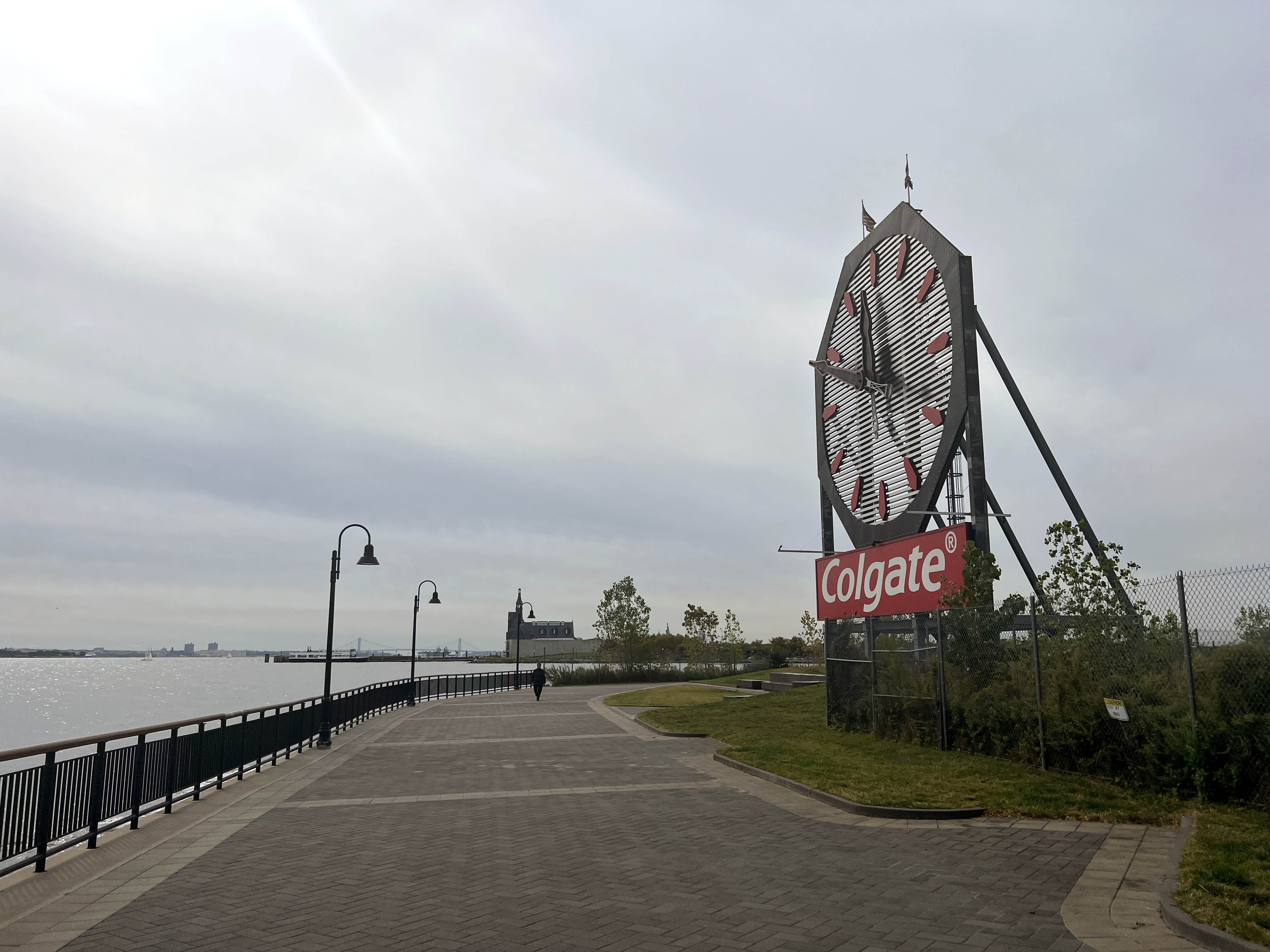
The clock and the bench at its foot. Visible in the background are the Central Railroad of New Jersey Terminal and the Statue of Liberty.

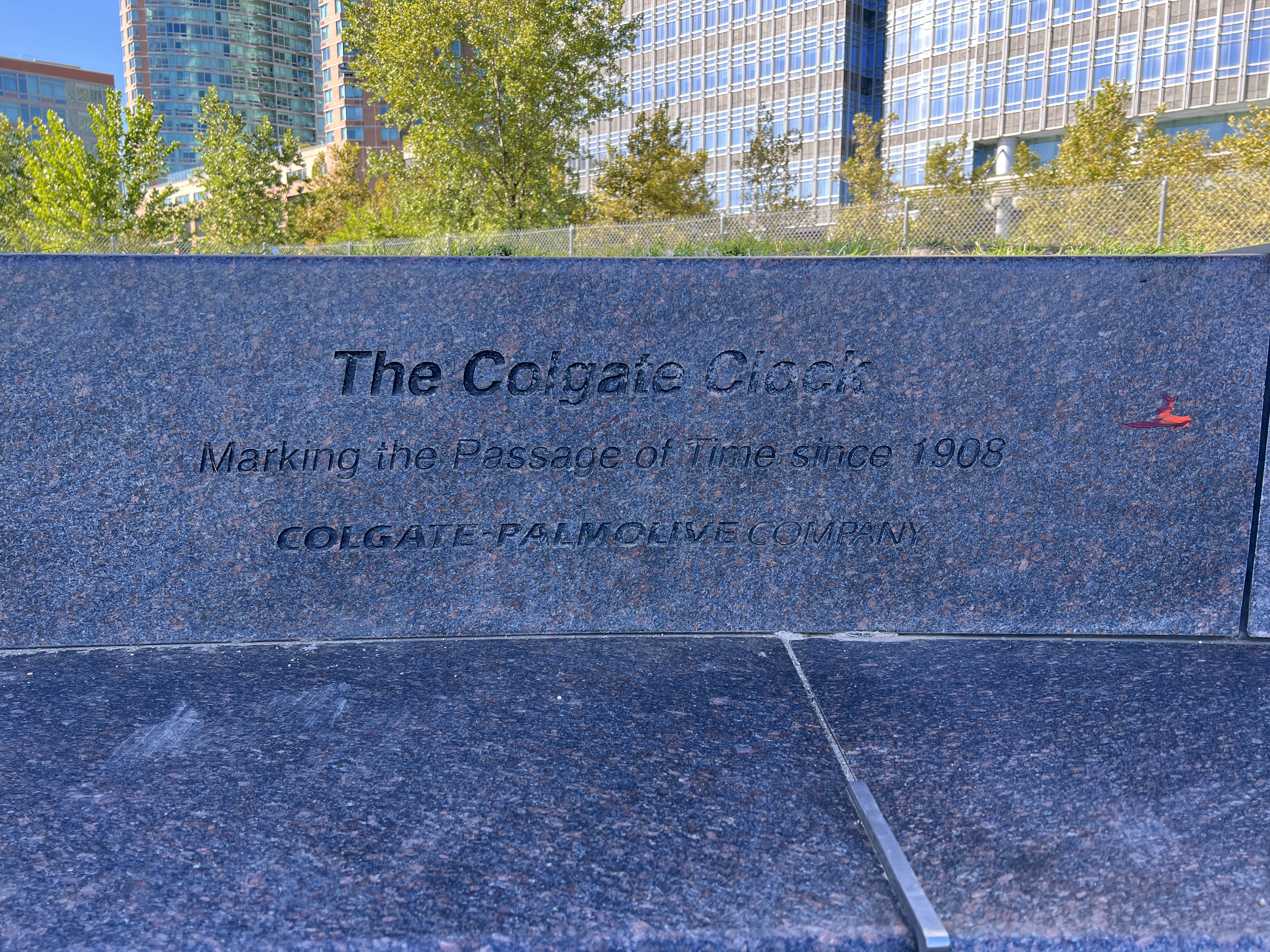
Inscribed on the bench at the foot of the clock are the words "The Colgate Clock: Marking the Passage of Time since 1908."

== See also ==
- Colgate Clock (Indiana)
- List of public art in Jersey City, New Jersey
