= 30 Hudson Street =

Skyscraper in Jersey City, New Jersey

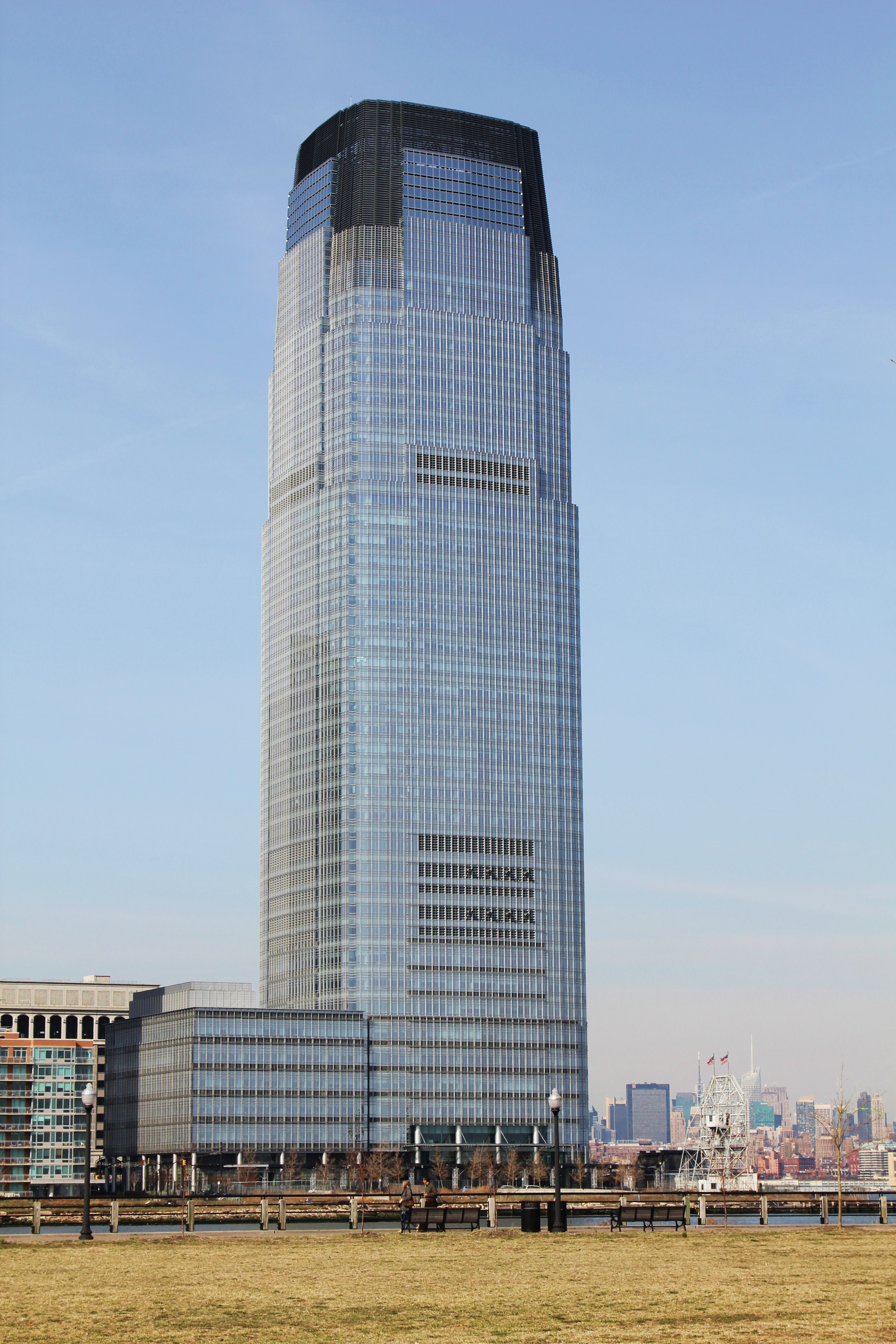
- A 2009 view of the tower from Liberty State Park
- Interactive map of the 30 Hudson Street area
- Alternative names: Goldman Sachs Tower

Record height
- Tallest in New Jersey from 2004 to 2018^{[I]}
- Preceded by: 101 Hudson Street
- Surpassed by: 99 Hudson Street

General information
- Type: Commercial Offices
- Location: 30 Hudson Street; Jersey City, New Jersey; United States
- Coordinates: 40.7130°N 74.0338°W
- Construction started: 2001
- Completed: 2004
- Operator: CB Richard Ellis

Height
- Roof: 781 ft (238 m)

Technical details
- Floor count: 42
- Floor area: 1,600,000 ft^{2} (148,645 m^{2})
- Lifts/elevators: 36

Design and construction
- Architects: Pelli Clarke Pelli, Adamson Architects, Inc. (as architect of record)
- Developer: Gerald D Hines Interests
- Structural engineer: Thornton Tomasetti
- Main contractor: Turner Construction

Website
- www.30hudson.com/index.html

30 Hudson Street, also known as Goldman Sachs Tower, is a 781 ft (238 m), 42-story building in Jersey City, New Jersey. It is the second tallest building in New Jersey. Completed in 2004, the tower was designed by César Pelli, and was the tallest building in the state for 14 years. It houses offices, a cafeteria, a health unit, and a full-service fitness facility including a physical therapy clinic.

The building is in the Exchange Place area close to a PATH station and is accessible by the Hudson-Bergen Light Rail at the Essex Street and Exchange Place stops.

The tower sits on the waterfront overlooking the Hudson River and Lower Manhattan and is visible from all five of the New York City boroughs. On a clear day, the building may be visible from Highlands, New Jersey to the south and from Bear Mountain, New York to the north, 40 miles (64 km) away.

Originally intended to be a dedicated use building for Goldman Sachs' middle and back office units, lower than projected staffing levels at the bank following the 2008 financial crisis forced Goldman to seek occupancy from other tenants to avoid forgone rental income. Royal Bank of Canada currently shares the space, with plans for other professional service firms to take occupancy as well in the near future. As of 2025, the building also houses the headquarters of Organon International and Lord Abbett.

== History ==
Originally the tower was meant to be the centerpiece of an entire Goldman Sachs campus at Exchange Place, which was to include a training center, a university, and a large hotel complex. Many of the company's Manhattan-based equity traders refused to move away from Wall Street, delaying the occupation of the building's top 13 floors, which remained vacant until early 2008.

Once a derelict and mostly industrial part of Jersey City, the Exchange Place area forms part of New Jersey's Gold Coast, a revitalized strip of land along the formerly industrial west bank of the Hudson. Economic development in the 2000s spurred large-scale residential, commercial, and office development along the waterfront.

Although the location was largely rejected by the company's financial executives, 4,000 Goldman Sachs employees made the move to the building, including much of the company's real estate, technology, operations, and administrative departments. The building is certified under LEED-NC Version 2.0 of the U.S. Green Building Council. The building has been surrounded by pedestrian protective scaffolding since 2010.

The company completed construction of another tower in 2010 to house the bulk of their sales and trading departments. It is located at 200 West Street in Lower Manhattan just north of Brookfield Place (originally the World Financial Center), almost directly across the water from 30 Hudson. Under their "Venice strategy", Goldman Sachs launched a ferry service between the two buildings in 2013, operated by the Billybey Ferry Company.

== In media ==
The building was used by the Bernie Sanders 2016 presidential campaign to symbolize Goldman Sachs and Hillary Clinton's ties to the company.

The building can briefly be seen in The Avengers when Iron Man prevents New York City from being struck by a missile, and in Spider-Man: Homecoming, when Tony Stark is about to revoke Peter Parker's Spider Man suit.

The building, along with its surrounding skyscrapers, is the background image for the recorded audio for Markus Schulz's Global DJ Broadcast World Tour recorded in Barcode in nearby Elizabeth.

== Gallery ==
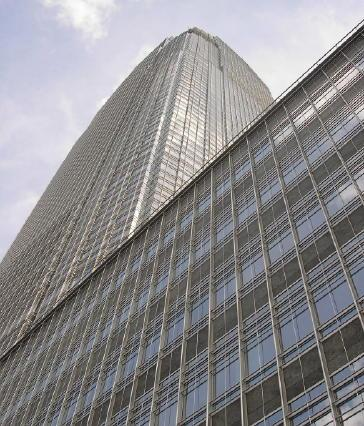
From below

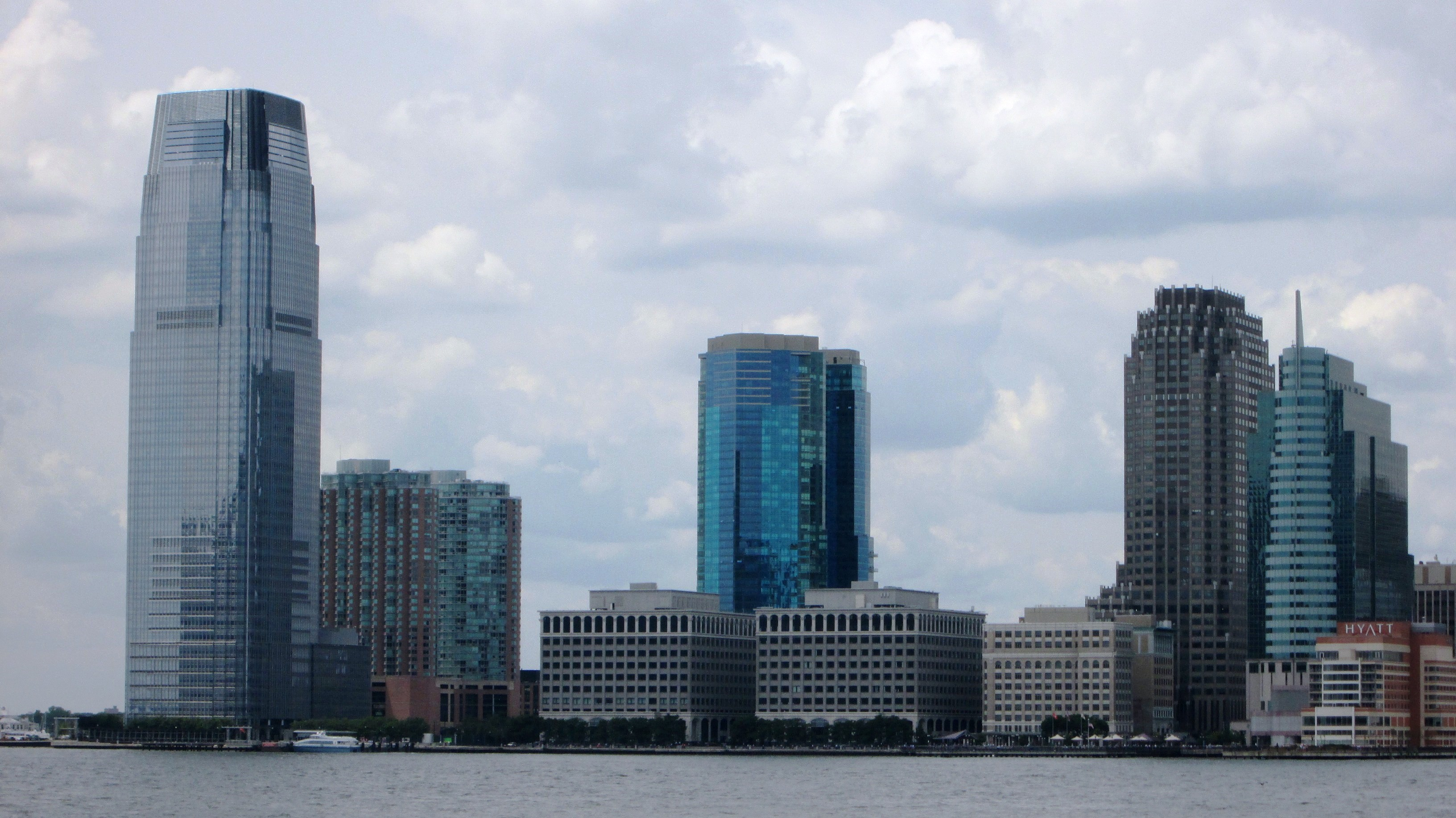
The tower seen with the Jersey City skyline from lower Manhattan

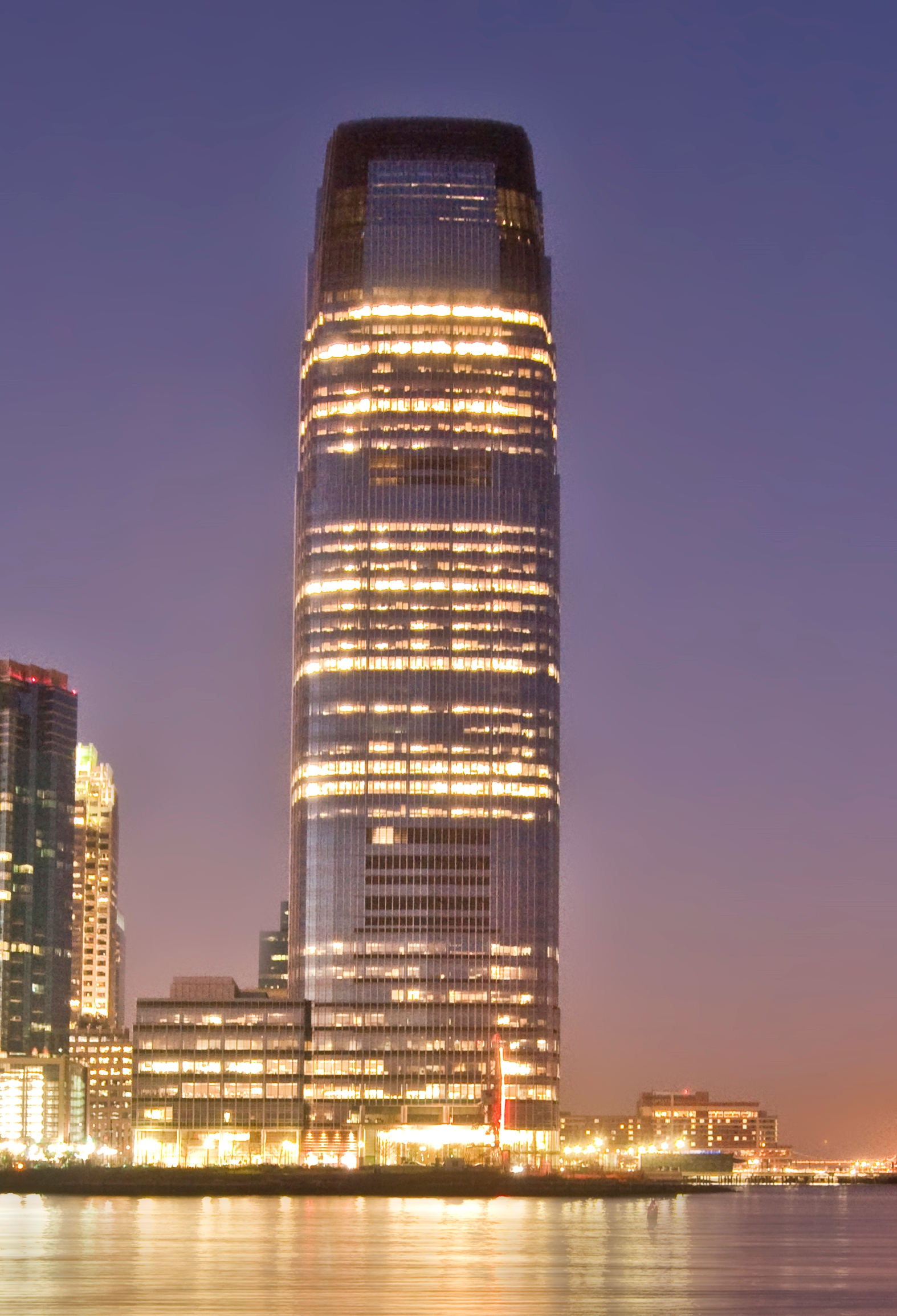
At night

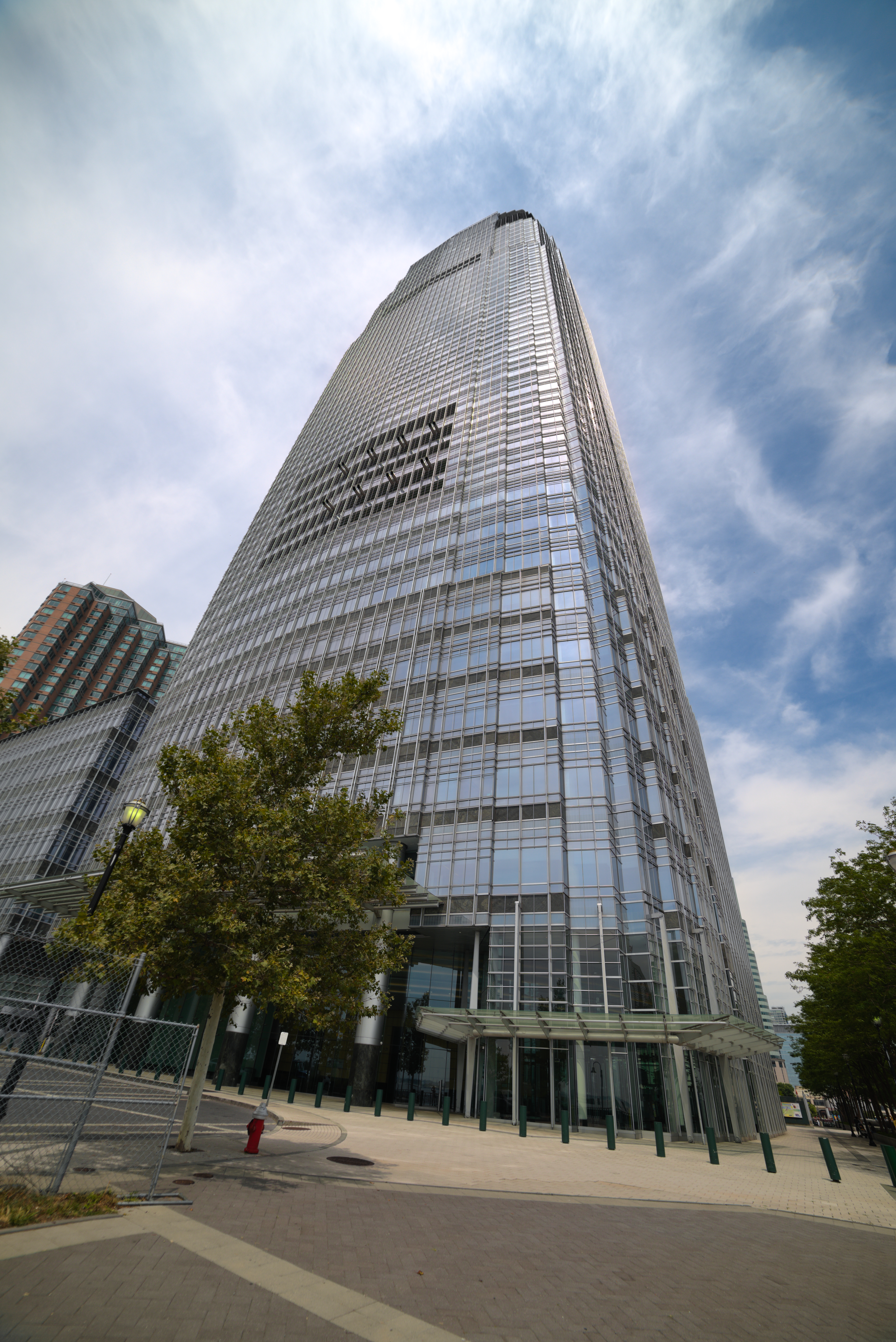
From the Colgate Center

== See also ==
- List of tallest buildings by U.S. state
- List of tallest buildings in Jersey City
- List of tallest buildings in New Jersey
- List of tallest buildings in the United States
- International Finance Centre Tower 1 in Hong Kong, designed similarly to the Goldman Sachs Tower
- 200 West Street in Lower Manhattan, Goldman Sachs global headquarters
