= The Modern (building complex) =

Residential skyscraper complex in Fort Lee, New Jersey

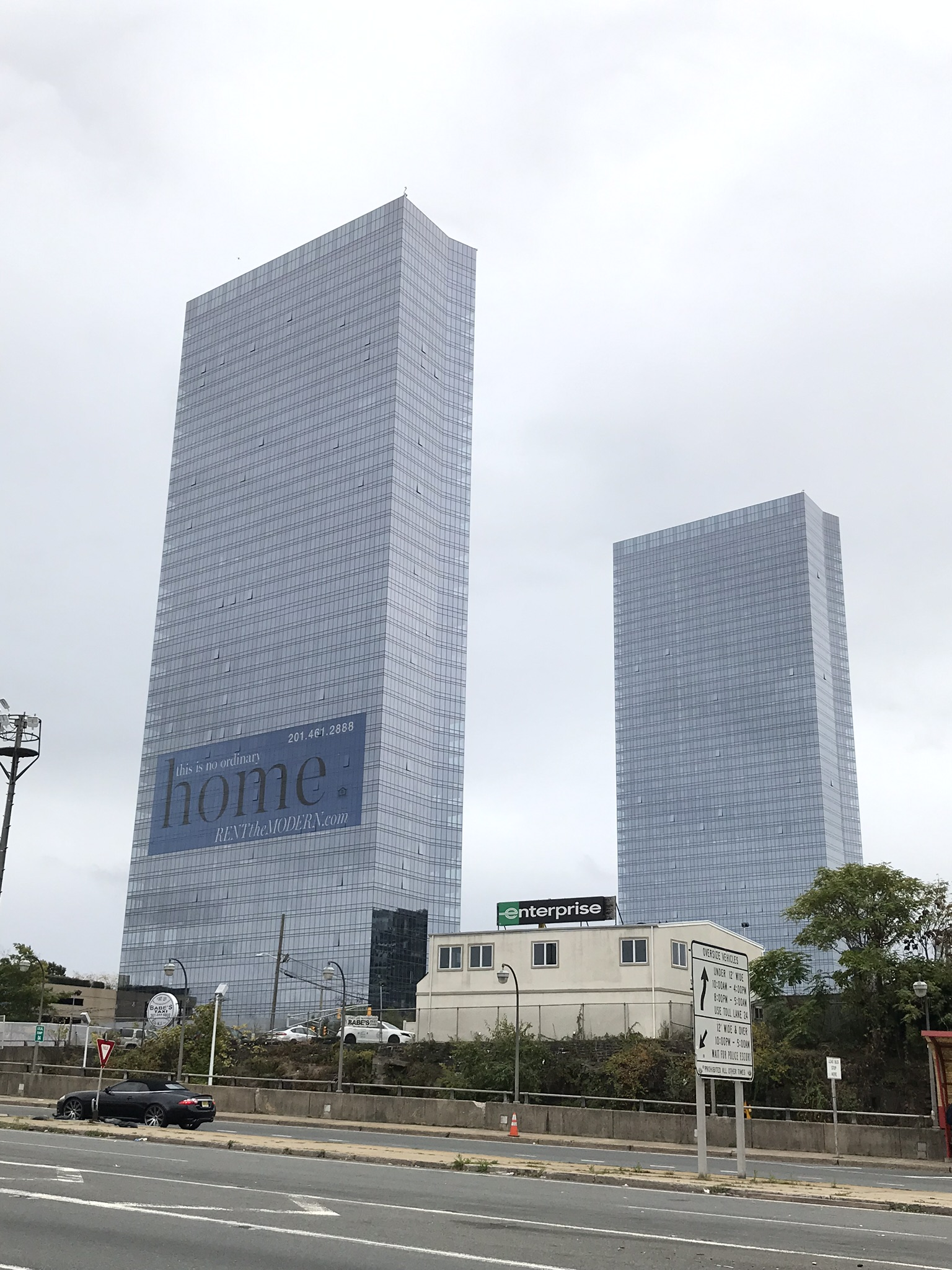
- Interactive map of the The Modern area

General information
- Type: Residential
- Location: Fort Lee, New Jersey
- Coordinates: 40°51′09″N 73°57′59″W
- Construction started: 2012
- Completed: 2014-15 (Tower 1) 2016-18 (Tower 2)
- Cost: $239 million

Height
- Roof: 496 ft (151 m)

Technical details
- Floor count: 47
- Lifts/elevators: 4

Design and construction
- Architect: Elkus Manfredi Architects
- Developer: SJP Properties
- Structural engineer: DeSimone Consulting Engineers
- Civil engineer: Paulus, Sokolowski and Sartor

The Modern is a residential skyscraper complex in Fort Lee, New Jersey near George Washington Bridge Plaza at the western end of the George Washington Bridge (GWB) on the Hudson Waterfront. Situated atop the Hudson Palisades, the twin towers provide panoramic views of the New York City skyline, the Hudson River, the GWB, and surrounding suburbs.

The architectural firm of Elkus Manfredi Architects designed the buildings, one of the world's tallest twin-tower projects. Construction began in 2014 and was completed in 2018. The towers are 496 ft (151 m) and 47 stories tall. It received a 2018 New Jersey Chapter of the American Society of Landscape Architects Merit Award and an honorable mention in the 2019 Architecture MasterPrize.

The towers are part of a larger urban renewal project for the long vacant parcel, where film studios were located when Fort Lee was the home America's first motion picture industry. The Barrymore Film Center was built adjacent to the towers. An adjacent project called Hudson Lights includes retail, hotel and office space, including a three-screen movie theater. The 16-acre (6.5 ha) site on which the Modern (east parcel) and Hudson Lights (west parcel) are built had been undeveloped for close to 47 years. Civic leaders in Ft. Lee had sought to develop the vacant, 16-acre site since the 1970s, two attempts to put together a project failed in between 1970 and 1980, and in 2008, a $1 billion development project by Centuria Corp., which then owned the site, fell through.

There was a controversy in which developers had tried to bribe Fort Lee's mayor via an organized crime representative. The mayor reported the incident, wore a wire, and exposed the attempt, as documented in the 1976 book The Bribe. William Zeckendorf acquired the site, but construction plans never materialized. Harry B. Helmsley later owned the parcels, but the intended project was not constructed. Town and Country Developers bought the tract from his estate in 2005. Eventually, SJP and Tucker Development acquired the two sites.

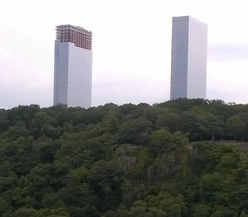
Modern 1 & 2 seen from the George Washington Bridge during construction

In 2016 an agreement was made with the town that The Modern and Hudson Lights would make Payments in Lieu of Taxes (PILOT). Developers of the project, SJP Properties, are funding the construction of new sewer lines to the town to accommodate the new residents created by the development. An approximately 2-acre (0.81 ha) area between the buildings was deeded back to the borough for use as public park. It does not include units which contribute to the boroughs affordable state required housing stock. The borough also anticipated traffic issues and a larger school population due to the new residents.

The project contains 75,000 square feet of indoor and outdoor amenities: an infinity pool, barbecue stations, basketball and volleyball courts, a lawn with an outdoor jumbotron, screening room, residents' lounge, business center, spa/sauna, fitness center, indoor and outdoor children's play areas, a covered dog walk and pet spa, golf simulation room, and karaoke/gaming room.

== See also ==
- List of tallest buildings in Fort Lee
- List of tallest buildings in New Jersey
- List of tallest twin buildings and structures in the world
- Hudson Waterfront
