= Newark Paramount Theatre =

Vaudeville house and movie theater in Newark, New Jersey

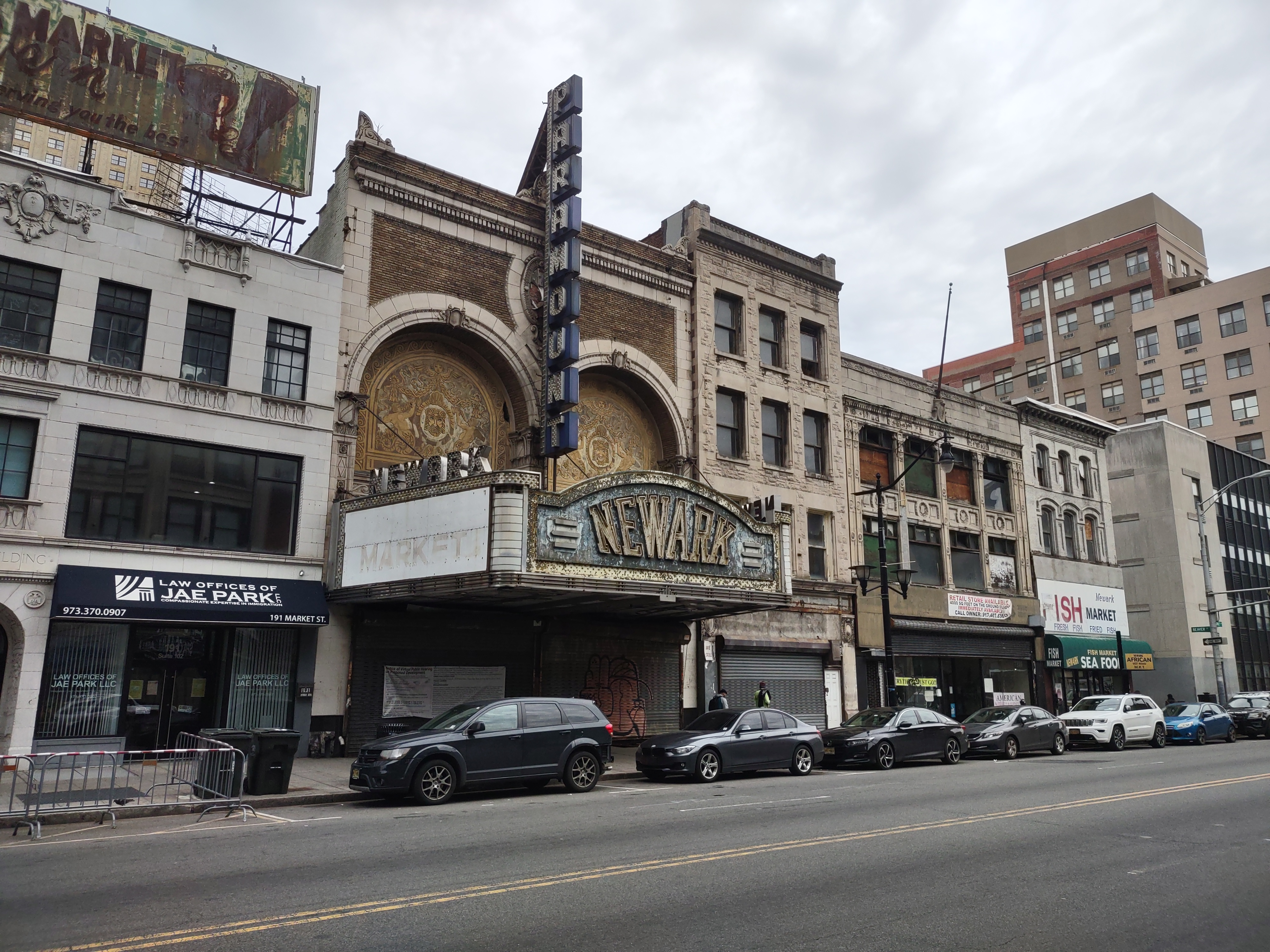
- Interactive map of Newark Paramount Theatre
- Former names: H.C. Miner's Newark Theatre
- Address: 195 Market Street, Newark, NJ 07102
- Coordinates: 40°44′08″N 74°10′16″W
- Type: Vaudeville house, movie theater
- Public transit: Newark Penn Station

Construction
- Opened: 1886
- Expanded: 1917, 1923
- Closed: 1986
- Architect: Thomas W. Lamb

The Newark Paramount Theatre is an abandoned vaudeville house turned "movie palace" film theatre in the Four Corners Historic District in Downtown Newark, New Jersey.

== History ==
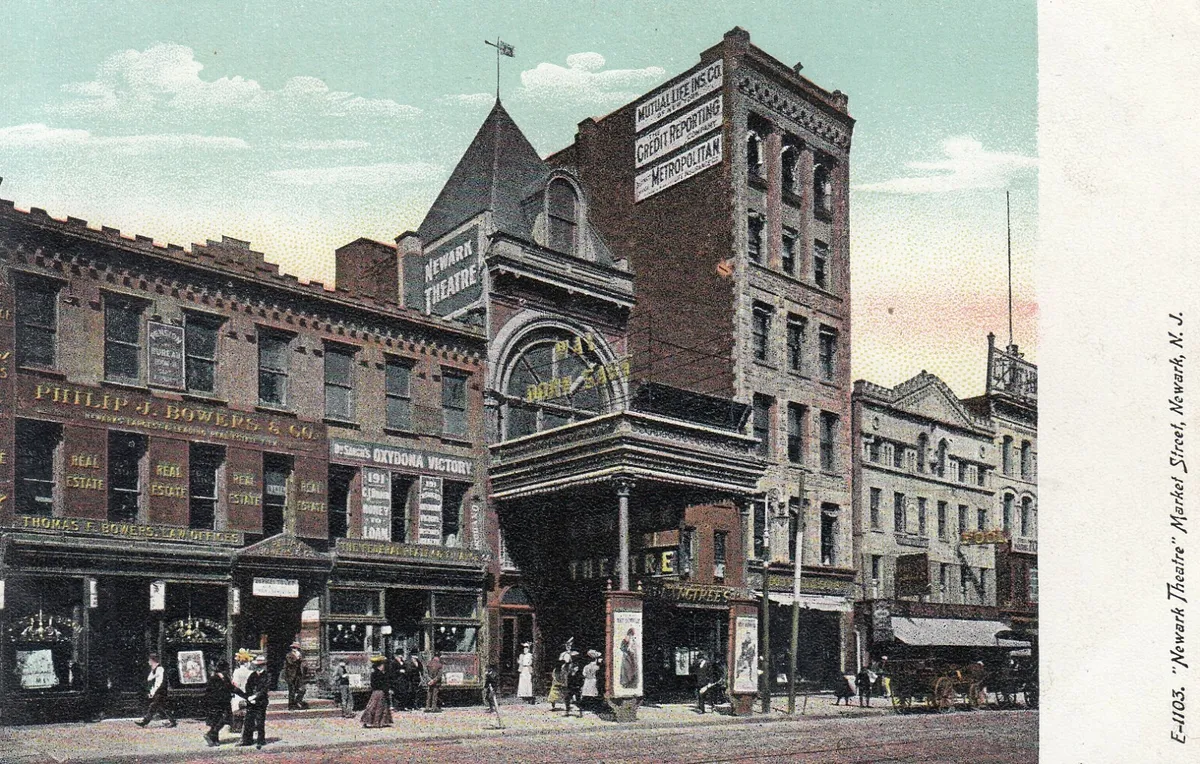
The Newark Paramount Theater in 1906

The theatre opened in 1886 and closed in 1986. The owner retained Scottish-born American architect Thomas W. Lamb to expand and renovate the house into an ornate movie palace in the early 20th century. The interior of the theater still stands, albeit dilapidated, and the marquee and signage remain intact. The comedian Jerry Lewis worked as an usher at the theater in his youth. It took the name "Paramount" circa 1930. Billie Holiday performed there.

The theatre's facade, slightly adjusted during production to read "New Art," appeared as the movie theater in front of which Joaquin Phoenix as Arthur Fleck worked as an advertising clown in the 2019 Todd Phillips film Joker.

The theater's roof collapsed in 2021.

In 2021, a redevelopment proposal by RBH Group, LLC was approved. The proposal was for a 14-story, 189-foot mixed-use tower, with a two-story podium for commercial uses, including 241 residential units. The redevelopment intended on demolishing the entire building except the historic façade and marquee, which would be restored. The redevelopment also included demolition of several neighboring properties which have also fallen into disrepair, including 193-201 Market Street as well as 12 Beaver Street.

In 2024, a new proposal was submitted and approved for a 28-story, 310-foot mixed-use tower, including 457 residential units.

In 2026, an updated proposal was submitted again, scaling down the 2024 approval closer to its initial 2021 proposal. The new redevelopment would be 16-stories, and still includes demolition of 197 and 199 Market Street. The plans remain the same to restore and preserve the historic façade and marquee.
