= Harborside (Jersey City) =

Mixed-use complex in Jersey City, New Jersey

Coordinates: 40.7178°N 74.0333°W

Harborside is a mixed-use residential, retail, and office complex in the Exchange Place district of Jersey City, New Jersey located on the Hudson Waterfront. The majority of the buildings were originally owned and managed by Veris Residential, however many of the buildings were sold to other companies, including Harborside Plaza 1, 2, 3, 4, 5, 6, and 10. The complex contains some of the tallest buildings in Jersey City.

== Harborside Plaza 1, 2, and 3 ==
Harborside 1, 2, and 3 are three eight-story interconnected office buildings located directly on the Hudson River. The structure was built between 1927 and 1931 for the Pennsylvania Railroad's “Pennsylvania Dock and Warehouse Company". It was designed to be a concrete and steel combined waterfront warehouse and shipping facility. In May 2022, a major renovation was completed of all three buildings, with design by Elkus Manfredi Architects, and development by Mack-Cali (now Veris Residential) and SJP Properties. In October 2022, Veris Residential announced they were selling the complex for $420 million.

Harborside 1 is 400,000 sq ft and the southernmost building. The building contains a terrace on the fourth floor.

Harborside 2 and 3 are between 725,00 sq ft to 761,200 sq ft buildings. The two buildings share the District Kitchen food hall, a 10,000 sq ft retail boutique space, Nana's Deli, District Restaurant, Frozen Therapy, Box & Bird and Simple Coffee, car rentals and parking, a bikeshare service and about 71,000 sq ft of general retail space.

== Harborside Plaza 4 ==
As of October 2026, Harborside Plaza 4 (also known as 20 Columbus Drive) is a skyscraper under construction that was approved in May 2024. In July 2023, Veris Residential sold the site to Related Companies for $58 million. Originally proposed as an office building in 2017, the approved building is planned on being a mixed-use residential.

The tower, designed by Handel Architects, is in the shape of an L. The northern part of the tower is set to be 38-stories, and the eastern portion of the tower is set to be 50-stories and top out at 684 ft (208 m). The exterior building design utilizes bronze-colored aluminum and glass. The lobby will be on the southeast section of the building, which is entranced by a new public plaza. The building will contain 12,374 sq ft of retail space split amongst three storefronts alongside Columbus Drive. The building will contain 800 units, breaking down into 161 studios, 432 one-bedrooms, and 207 two-bedrooms. The building will contain 399 parking spaces in a garage, as well as 411 bicycle parking spaces on the ground, 4th, and 5th floors. The building will contain several amenities. The top of the 9th floor will contain an outdoor landscaped common deck, alongside several indoor amenity spaces. A health club will be located on the 2nd floor. The 39th floor is entirely dedicated to both inside and outdoor amenities, including an outdoor pool on the roof of the shorter tower of the building.

== Harborside Plaza 5 ==
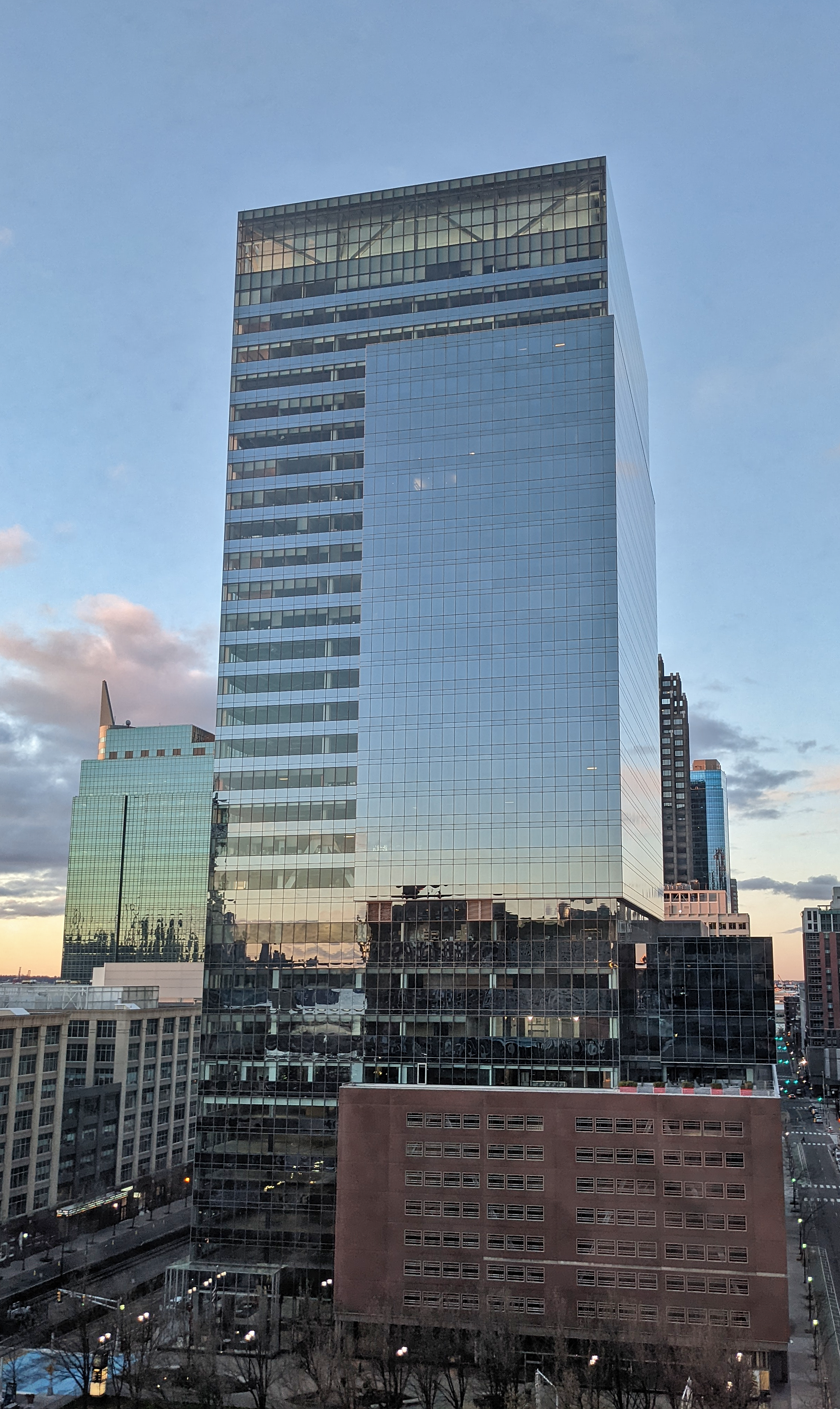
Harborside Plaza 5 at 185 Hudson St

Harborside Plaza 5 is a 480-foot (146m) tall high-rise office building completed in 2002 designed by Grad Associates. The building has 34 floors and nearly 1 million sq ft of space. In February 2024, Veris Residential announced they were selling the property for $85 million. In March 2024, following the sale, the new owner acquired a $65 million acquisition loan.

== Harborside Plaza 6 ==
Harborside Plaza 6 is a 200,00 sq ft office building. In 2023, it was sold to American Equity Partners for $46 million. The floors contain 17-foot high ceilings and floor-to-ceiling windows. There is also a 7-story parking garage with 1,000 spaces, as well as a Whole Foods as the ground floor retail tenant.

== Harborside Plaza 8 ==
Harborside Plaza 8 is a proposed skyscraper that was proposed in 2019 and approved in 2020. The building is to be a 708 ft (216 m) tall, 68-story residential tower. The building is to contain 680 units, broken down into 206 studios, 266 one-bedrooms, 183 two-bedrooms, and 25 three-bedrooms. The building will contain 505 parking spaces, of which 329 will be located in a garage that consists of the first 8 floors, while the remaining 176 spaces, which are to be located on a surface lot, are to become Harborside Plaza 9. The ground floor will contain two retail storefronts.

The 10th and 11th floors will contain amenity spaces with a plethora of amenities, including a yoga studio, a personal training area, a fitness center, children's room, multiple collaborative work rooms, a maker space, a demonstration kitchen, an outdoor amenity terrace, a pool, golf simulators, a dog run, a club room, library, conservatory, dining area, and wine bar complete with catering kitchen. A lawn and plaza are also to be built alongside the building.

In December 2025, Panepinto Properties acquired the property, along with Harborside Plaza 9, from Veris Residential for $75 million, ending the last of Veris Residential's ownership in the Harborside complex.

== Harborside Plaza 9 ==
Harborside Plaza 9 is a proposed skyscraper that was approved in July 2024. The tower is to rise 57-stories at 607 ft (185 m) tall. The project is located on a surface lot that is currently used as parking for workers of Harborside Plaza 10 adjacent to the planned Harborside Plaza 8, which incorporated a surface parking lot into its plans for future development. There is currently no groundbreaking date.

The building will contain 579 units, broken into 96 studios, 307 one-bedrooms, 166 two-bedrooms, and 10 three-bedroom units, including 87 affordable units. The 9th floor of the building is the amenity floor, and is to contain a pickleball court, fitness area, a game room, an outdoor deck, an outdoor pool, and co-working space. Additionally, the building will contain 14,480 sq ft of retail space, 300 bicycle parking spaces, and a 555-space parking garage (300 of which will be used for Harborside Plaza 10 parking).

In December 2025, Panepinto Properties acquired the property, along with Harborside Plaza 8, from Veris Residential for $75 million, ending the last of Veris Residential's ownership in the Harborside complex.

== Harborside Plaza 10 ==
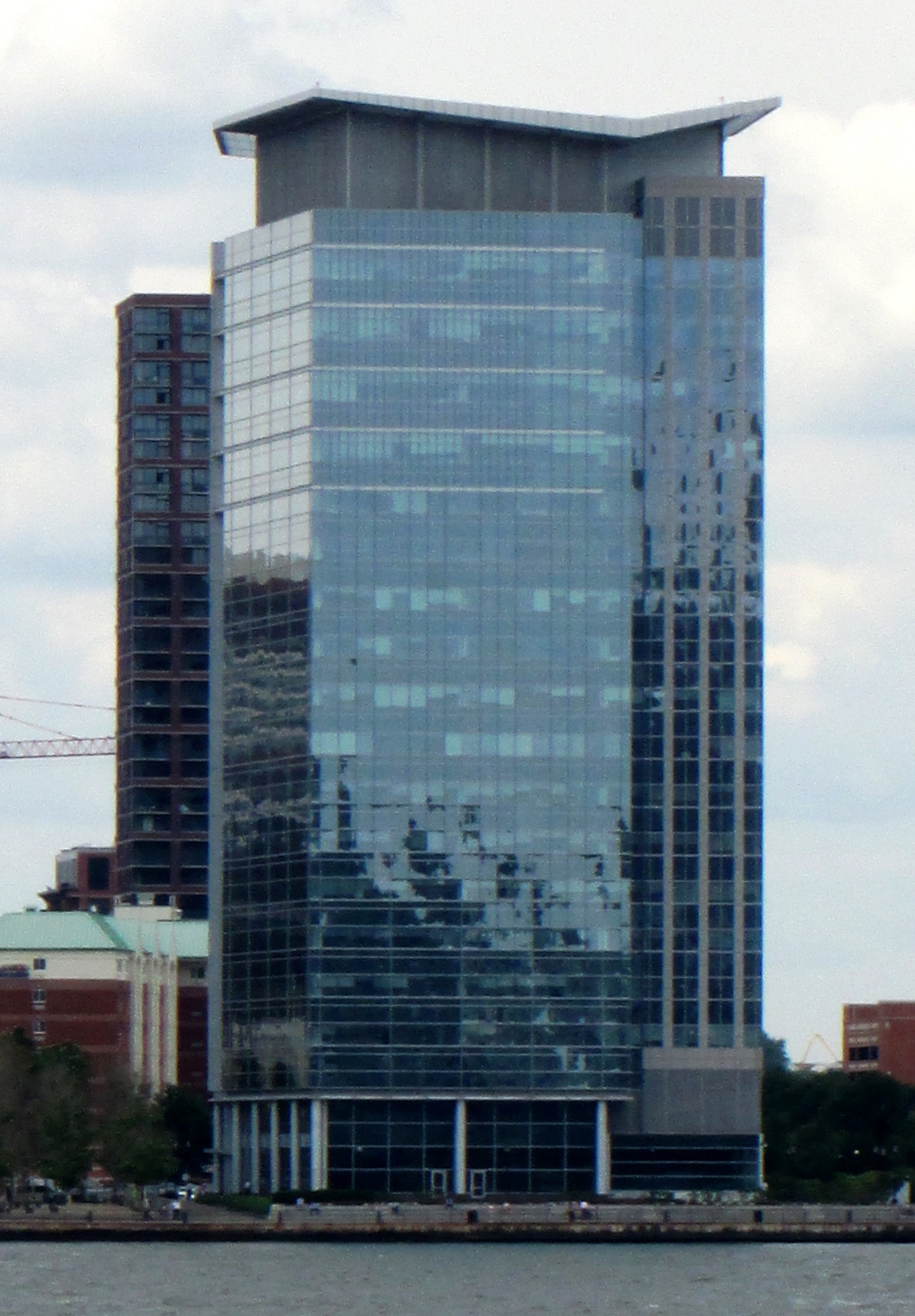
Harborside Plaza 10, built in 2002 for Charles Schwab Corporation, as seen from Battery Park City in Manhattan

Harborside Plaza 10 is a waterfront office tower developed by Veris Residential for the Charles Schwab Corporation, in 2002. The building features several amenities, including a gold-leaf domed granite lobby, high ceilings, a riverside patio, and two restaurants.

== URBY ==
Originally planned as URL Harborside, also known as Harborside Plaza 7, it was a planned mixed use tower that would be 59 floors and 800 feet (244m) tall. The proposed building was designed by Kohn Pedersen Fox Associates. In 2015, the plans were scrapped in favor of Jersey City Urby, a three-building complex.

Tower One of the complex was completed in 2017, where it stands at 700 ft (210 m) and 70 floors, where it is the 5th-tallest building in both New Jersey and Jersey City. Tower Two and Tower Three are both approved but have not started construction, both of which will be 677 ft (206 m) tall and 69-stories each.

== See also ==
- Powerhouse Arts District, Jersey City
- List of tallest buildings in Jersey City
