= Exchange Place, Jersey City =

Commercial district in Hudson County, New Jersey, US

Coordinates: 40°42′58″N 74°01′59″W

Exchange Place
- Neighborhood of Jersey City
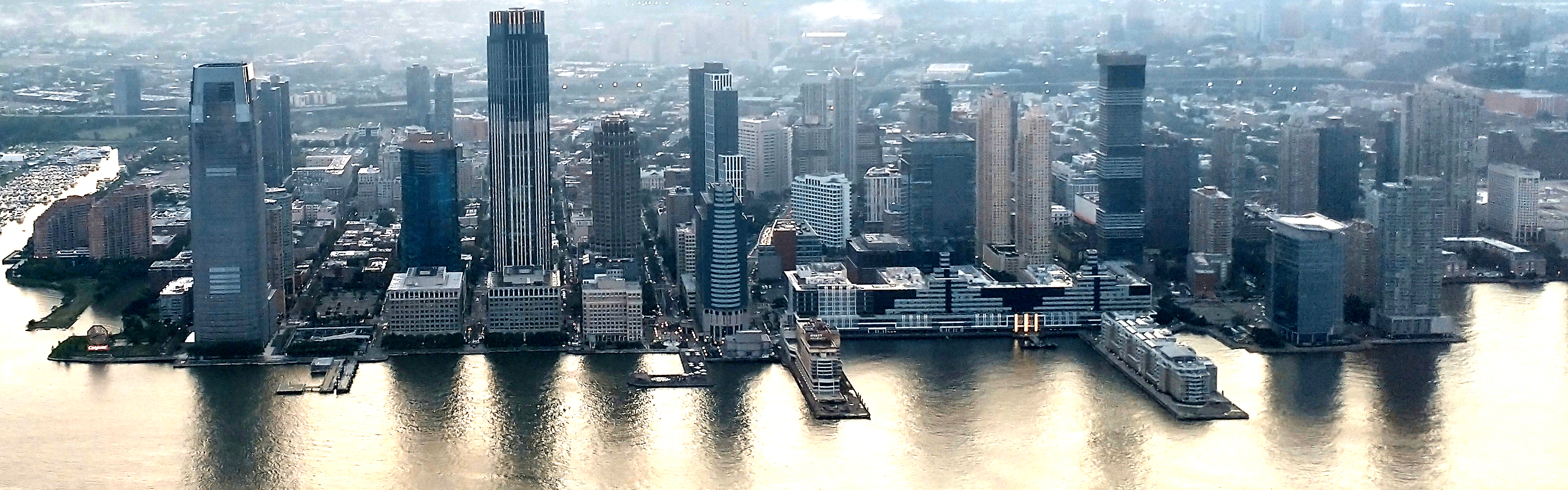
- View of Exchange Place from One World Trade Center, 2023
- Interactive map of Exchange Place
- Country: United States
- State: New Jersey
- City: Jersey City

Population (2010)
  - Total: 83,828
  - Summer (DST): UTC−05:00

Exchange Place is a district of Downtown Jersey City, New Jersey that is sometimes referred to as Wall Street West due to the concentration of financial companies that have offices there. The namesake is a square, about 200 feet long, at the foot of Montgomery Street at the waterfront of the Hudson River. This square was created by landfilling the shore at Paulus Hook, and has been a major transportation hub since the colonial era.

== Vicinity ==
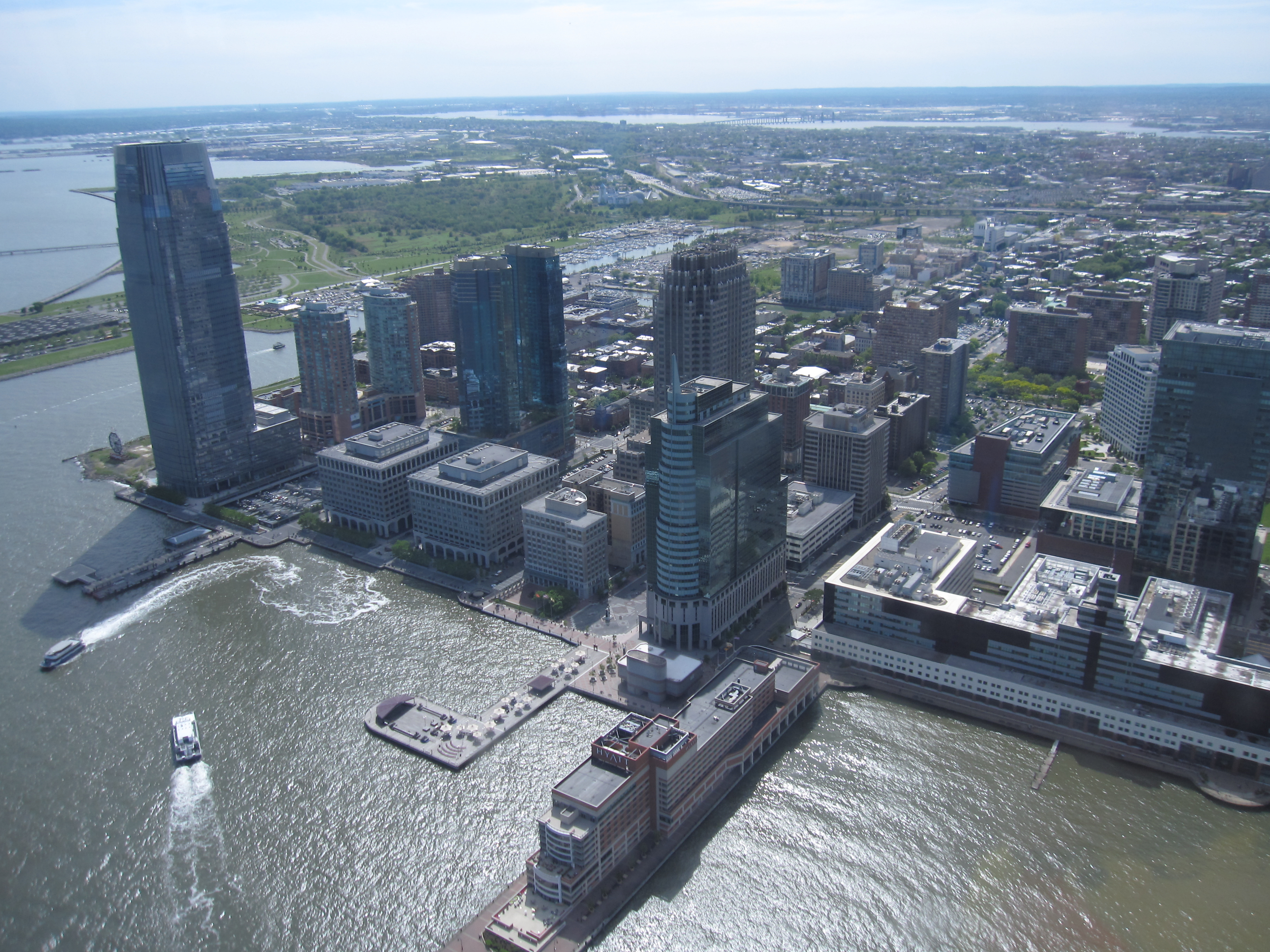
Aerial view of Exchange Place in 2010

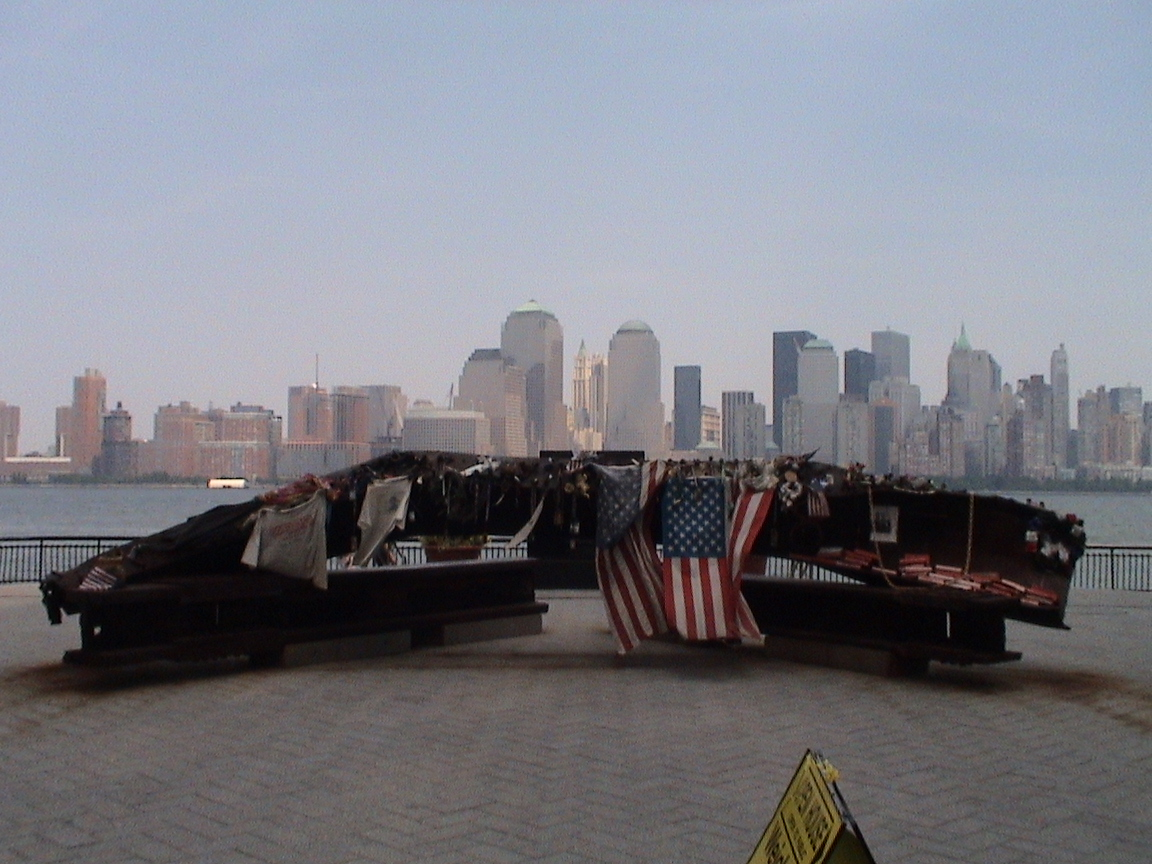
Jersey City 9/11 Memorial

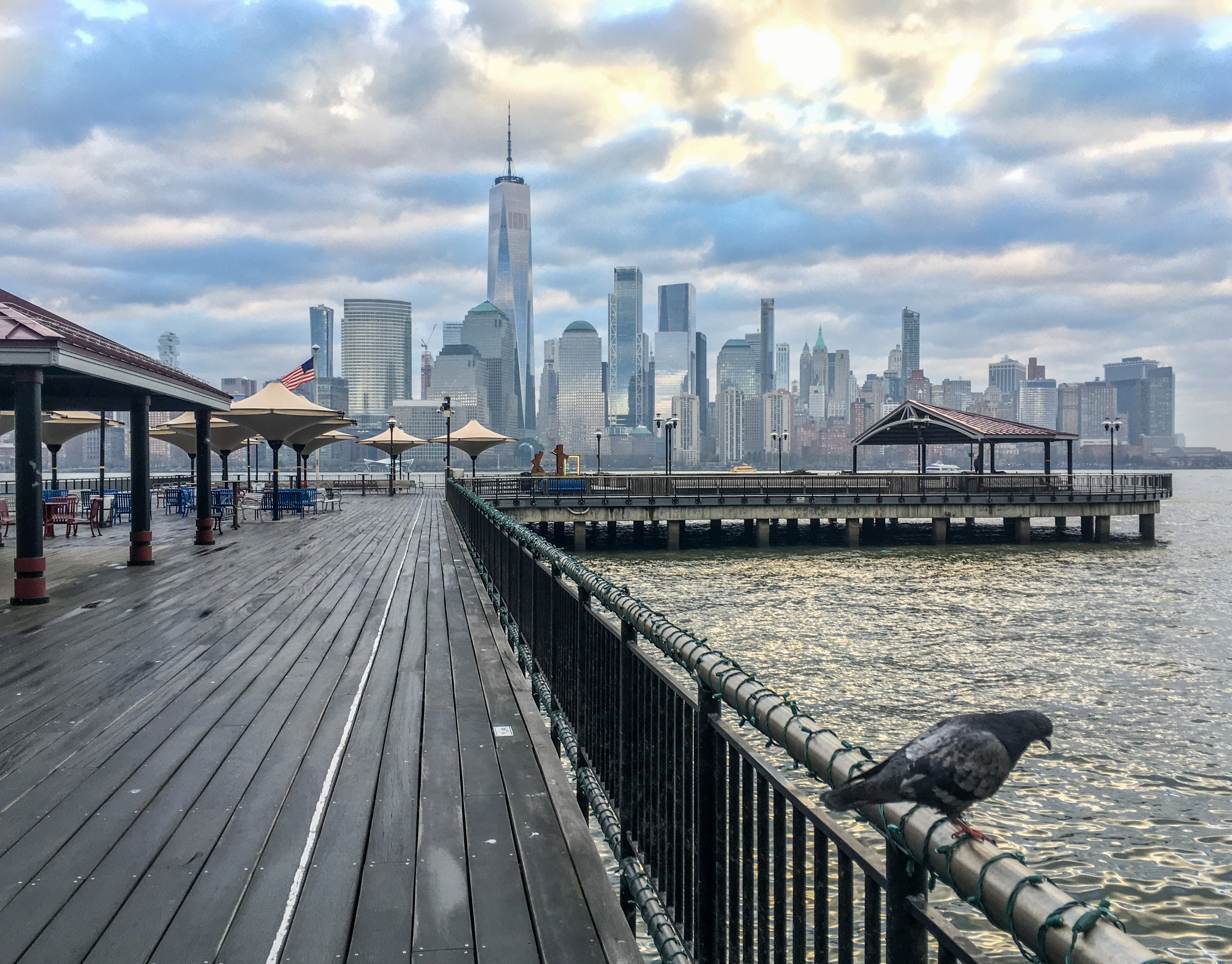
Lower Manhattan skyline as seen from Exchange Place

A high concentration of highrise office and residential buildings in the city are located in the district radiating from Exchange Place, which since the 1990s has overtaken Journal Square as Hudson County's major business district and become a major business center along the redeveloped waterfronts in the Port of New York and New Jersey. The Mack-Cali building is host to several nesting sites for peregrine falcons. The Hudson River Waterfront Walkway crosses Exchange, the other side of which is J. Owen Grundy Park, extending into the Hudson River.

The Katyń Memorial by Polish-American artist Andrzej Pitynski is the first memorial of its kind to be raised on American soil to honor the dead of the Katyń Forest massacre. In early May 2018, Holocaust survivor Edward Mosberg co-signed a letter asking Jersey City Mayor Steven Fulop not to remove the Katyń Memorial from Exchange Place in the city, writing: "The memory of the Katyn massacre is an important part of the memory and memories of the Holocaust and we encourage you to reconsider your decision to remove this monument."

To the south are New York Waterway's Paulus Hook Ferry Terminal, and the two tallest buildings in New Jersey; the Goldman Sachs Tower and 99 Hudson. The Colgate Clock, promoted by Colgate-Palmolive as the largest in the world, faces Battery Park in lower Manhattan. The clock, which is 50 feet (15 m) in diameter with a minute hand weighing 2,200 pounds, was erected in 1924 to replace a smaller one that was relocated to a plant in Jeffersonville, Indiana. The riverfront promenade, which provides vistas of Lower Manhattan, continues along the Morris Canal Little Basin, part of Liberty State Park. To the north is the former warehouse now housing Harborside Financial Center.

== History ==
As early as July 1764 a ferry began operating from Paulus Hook to Mesier's dock which was located at the foot of Courtland Street (where Cortland Street Ferry Depot would be built) and where Battery Park City Ferry Terminal is located today. The first steam ferry service in New York Harbor and the world was established in 1812 by Robert Livingston (1746-1813) and Robert Fulton and traveled between Paulus Hook and Cortlandt Street in Manhattan. The ferry dock stood at the head of the important highway to Newark (and points west and south) established in 1795. The ferry in turn influenced the location of the terminal of the New Jersey Railroad, which opened in 1838 running from the ferry dock via Newark to New Brunswick. The railroad purchased the ferry operation in 1853 and in 1858 built a much-needed larger intermodal terminal. After acquiring the railroad in 1871, the Pennsylvania Railroad replaced the terminal in 1876 and yet again in 1888–1892. Passengers could move directly between the trains and ferries without going outside (a similar plan can still be seen today at Hoboken Terminal). The railroad referred to the location simply as Jersey City, and if necessary to distinguish it from other railroads' terminals, as the Pennsylvania station.

It was probably the street railways, the local transportation in Jersey City, that first needed to identify the location more precisely as Exchange Place. Beginning with horsecars in 1860, the local network connected the ferry with neighborhoods in the city and nearby towns. An off-street terminal called "Exchange Place" was established in 1891. It was almost at the water's edge, across the street from the Pennsylvania Railroad terminal and with easy access to the ferries. Cars with signs reading EXCHANGE PLACE could be seen all over town. In 1901, the privately held land was given to the city by the PRR.

The Hudson and Manhattan Railroad opened its tunnels from Exchange Place to New York in 1910. Significantly, the station was at first called "Pennsylvania Railroad Station", not Exchange Place, but by 1916 the name was expanded to include "Exchange Place". By 1926 the H & M station was simply "Exchange Place". The Pennsylvania Railroad did not officially give in until some years later, but all the stations, and the neighborhood, were firmly known as Exchange Place by the 1920s.

For many years the location functioned similarly to Hudson Place, farther up the Hudson waterfront, as a terminus for the many trolley lines which crisscrossed Hudson County, as well as for those which traveled farther, from destinations such as the Newark Public Service Terminal, or the Broadway Terminal in Paterson. At one time more than ten lines operated by the Public Service Railway originated/terminated here. The substitution of rail lines with busses, colloquially known as bustitution, was completed in 1949.

Ferry services were also discontinued in 1949, and while the Pennsylvania Railroad service dwindled after the opening of Penn Station in New York in 1910, it did not end until 1962. Following the end of service on the Jersey City Branch, the remains of the large terminal were demolished, leaving a large open space on the waterfront. This and the elimination of other railroad passenger and freight yards along the river during the 1960s and 1970s opened up the land that would be used for redevelopment. The continued use of the name "Exchange Place" was based on the Hudson and Manhattan station (PATH since 1962) and signs on the bus routes that had replaced the trolleys.

Since 2000, both a trolley service, in the form of the Hudson–Bergen Light Rail, and a ferry service, provided by NY Waterway at the Paulus Hook Hook Ferry Terminal, have been restored. It is also the terminus for several New Jersey Transit and privately operated bus routes.

== Transportation ==
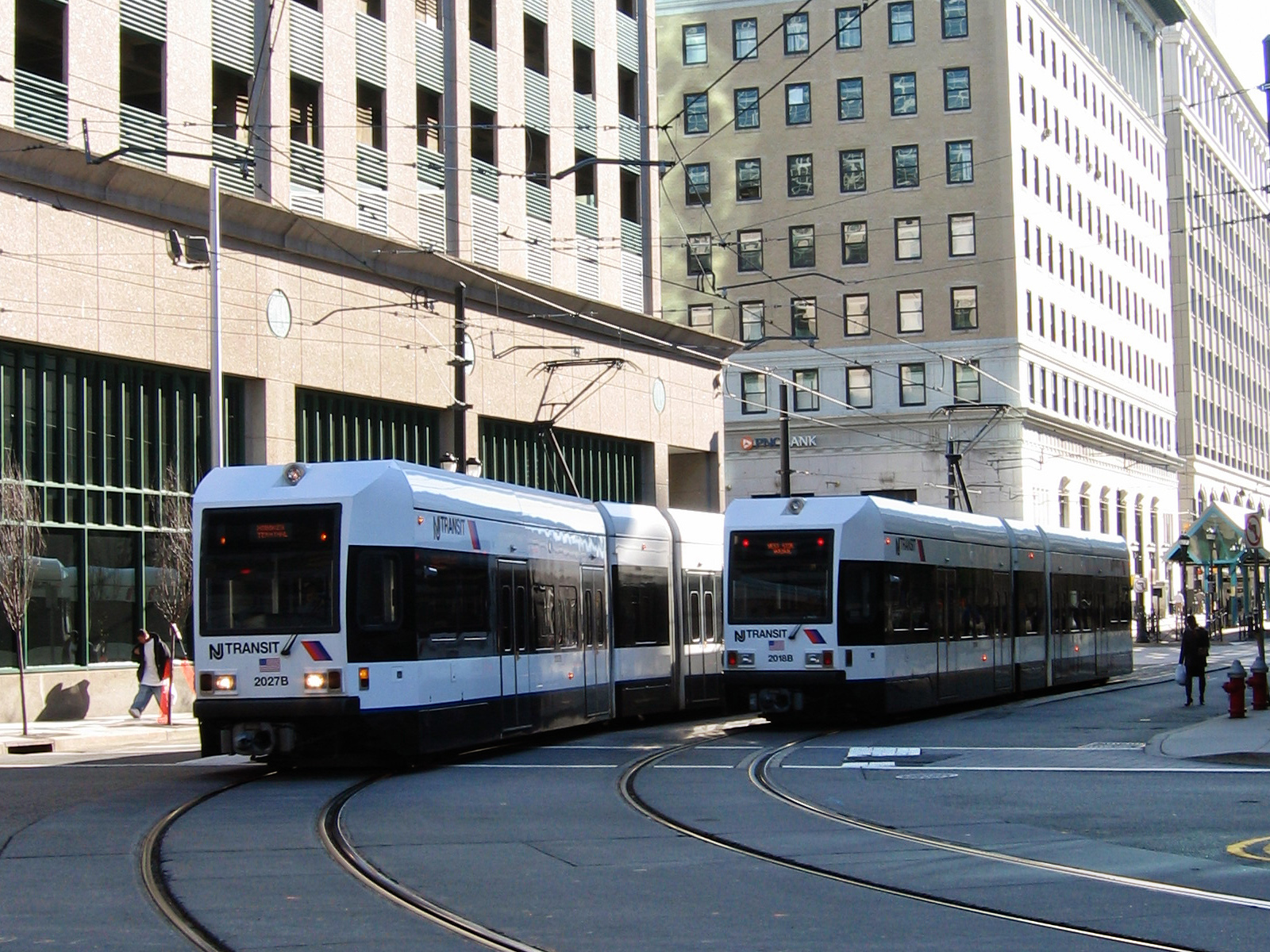
Hudson–Bergen Light Rail trains traveling between stations

=== PATH ===
PATH service from Exchange Place runs east to the World Trade Center, north to Hoboken Terminal, and west to Journal Square and Newark Penn Station.

=== HBLR ===
Three stations of the Hudson–Bergen Light Rail in the district are Harborside Financial Center, Essex Street and Exchange Place, where transfer to PATH and ferry are possible.

=== Paulus Hook Ferry Terminal ===
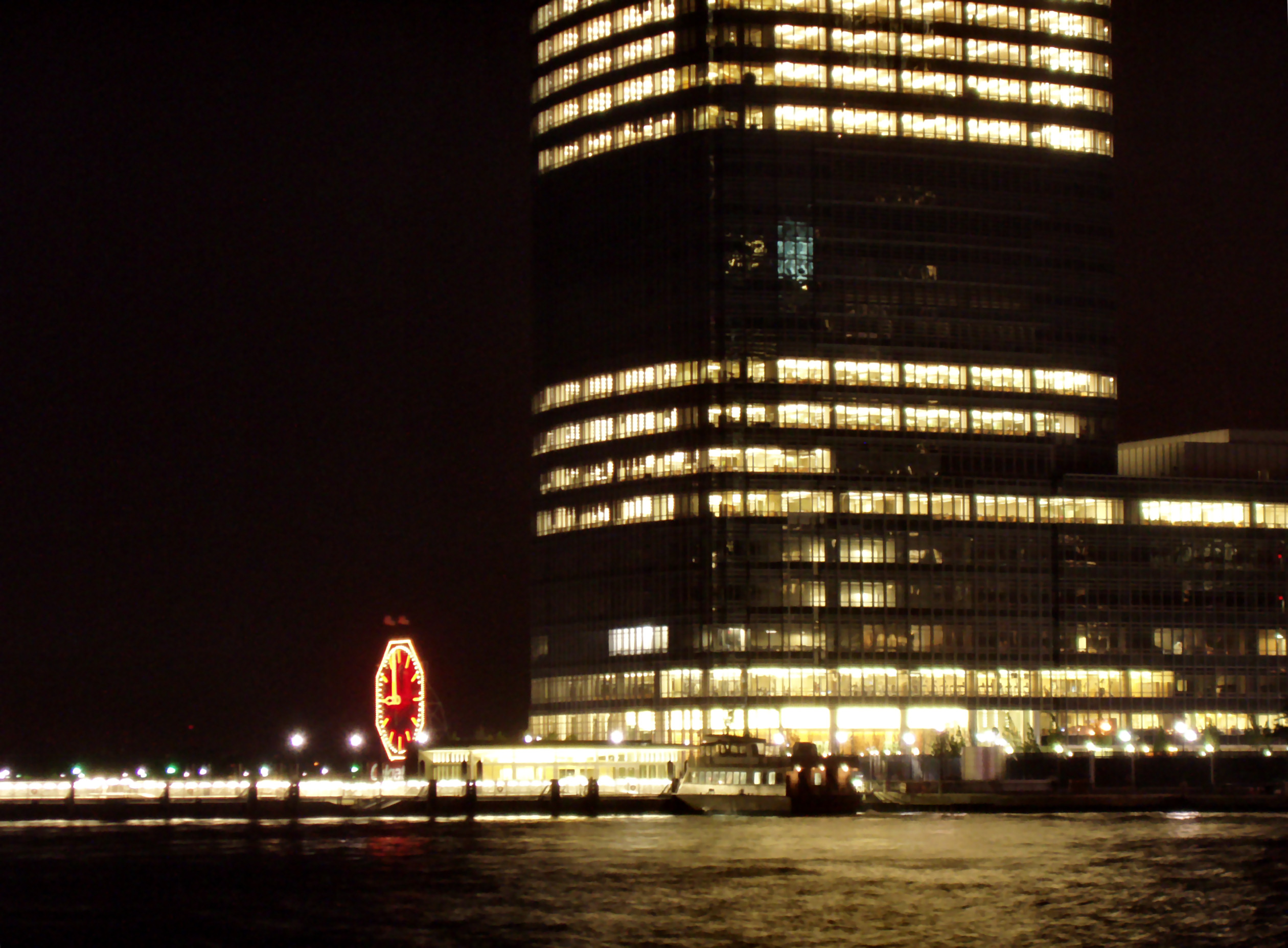
Colgate Clock and Paulus Hook Ferry Terminal

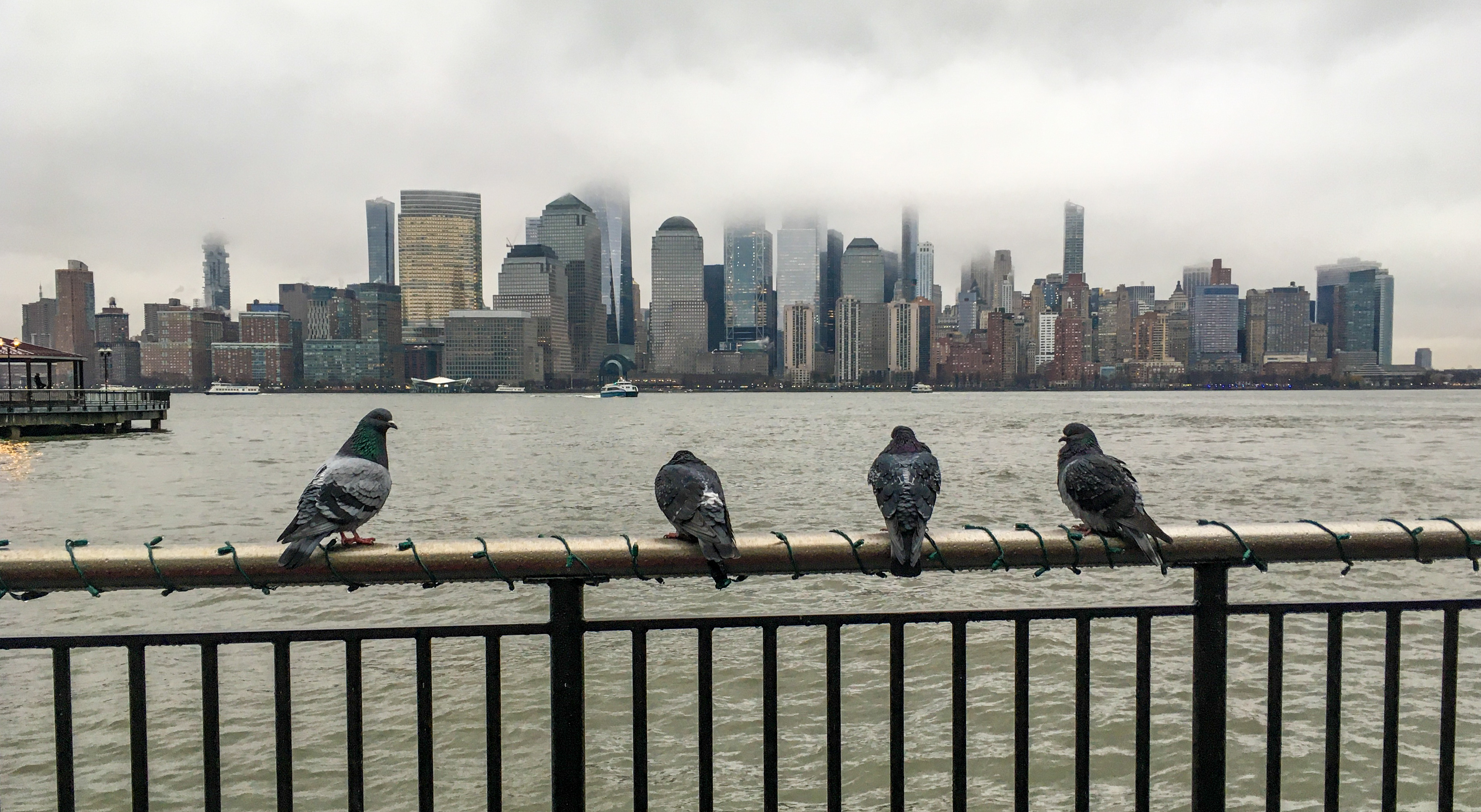
Ferry service departing Battery Park City (background) towards Paulus Hook (foreground)

The ferry that started in 1764 became known as the Jersey City Ferry, but after nearly 200 years of service, the last regular ferry service across the Hudson ended in the 1960s. Service was revived in 1986, and today the Hudson's ferries are operated by New York Waterway.

company	route	destination	notes
NY Waterway	West Midtown Ferry Terminal; Midtown Manhattan	Pier 79; West Side Highway-West 39th St; Javits Convention Center	free transfer to Manhattan "loop" buses
NY Waterway	Battery Park City Ferry Terminal at World Financial Center	Hudson River Park at Vesey Street; Battery Park City	paid transfer to NYC Ferry, NY Waterway, Liberty Landing Ferry, and Seastreak routes
NY Waterway	Wall Street	Pier 11; South Street south of South Street Seaport	paid transfer to NYC Ferry, NY Waterway, and Seastreak routes
NY Waterway	Belford	Raritan Bayshore; Monmouth County	via The Narrows & Upper Bay

=== Bus ===
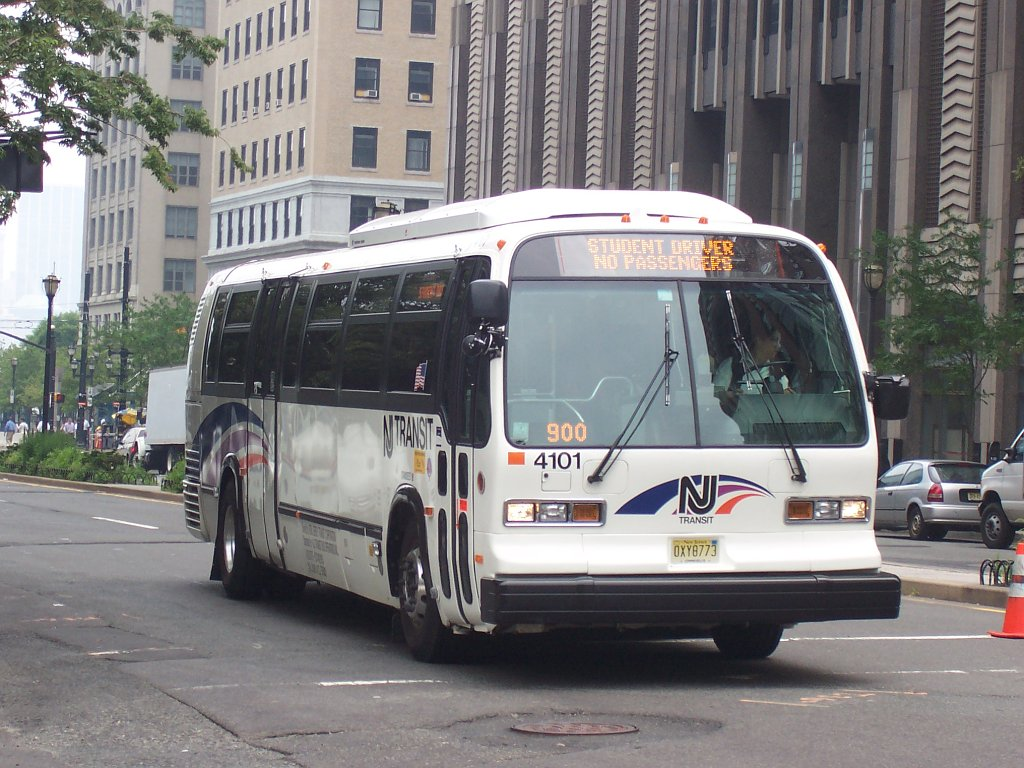
Bus traveling along Montgomery Street in 2006

Route	destination	major points
1 limited service NJT	Newark-Ivy Hill via Newark-Ironbound and Downtown Newark	West Side; Lincoln Highway–Kearny Point; Ferry Street/Raymond Boulevard; Market Street
9 NJT	Country Village	Grove Street Station; Van Vorst Park; McGinley Square; West Side Avenue; Danforth Avenueor Journal Square limited service
64 NJT	Lakewood	Newport Centre Mall Hoboken Lincoln Harbor Freehold Old Bridge Georgian Court University
68 NJT	Old Bridge	South River Newport Centre Mall Hoboken Lincoln Harbor
80 NJT	Greenville; Old Bergen Road	Newark Avenue; Five Corners; India Square; JSQ; West Side Avenue; Danforth Avenue
81 NJT	Bayonne via Greenville	Grove Street Station; Communipaw Junction; Danforth Avenue; Curries WoodsOcean Ave Ave C
82 NJT	Greenville regular service Hudson County Correction Facility limited service	Newark Avenue; West Side Avenue or Lincoln Highway limited service
86 AM and PM peak service NJT	Bergenline Station	Grove Street Station; Newport Centre MallNewark Avenue; 9th/Congress Station; Weehawken Water Tower
Academy Bus	Garden State Arts Center	limited peak service

== In popular culture ==
The views provided along the waterfront are often featured as background images of New York City and One World Trade Center that have been used for Gmail, WordPress, and Emporis. The EarthCam webcam for One World Trade Center, which is placed on top of the Hyatt Regency Hotel, is viewed by millions every week and is occasionally used by local TV news stations.

The 1998 film Godzilla used the area that the Goldman Sachs Tower currently occupies as the location for a military base. The Exchange Place PATH station was used to film an episode of Law & Order: Special Victims Unit, and the ending of the film Sid and Nancy was shot in the vicinity of Exchange Place near Harborside.

A segment of MTV's "The Week in Rock" was filmed along the Exchange Place waterfront during an interview with Queen Latifah.

The pier and its New York backdrop is commonly used in the 2021 series The Equalizer as the location where Robyn and William privately meet.

The view of Lower Manhattan from Exchange Place has been used for shots in the music video for Demi Lovato's I Love Me and in the lyric video for Afrojack and David Guetta's song Hero.

== See also ==
- List of Public Service Railway lines
- List of ferries across the Hudson River to New York City
