= 99 Hudson Street =

Skyscraper in Jersey City, New Jersey

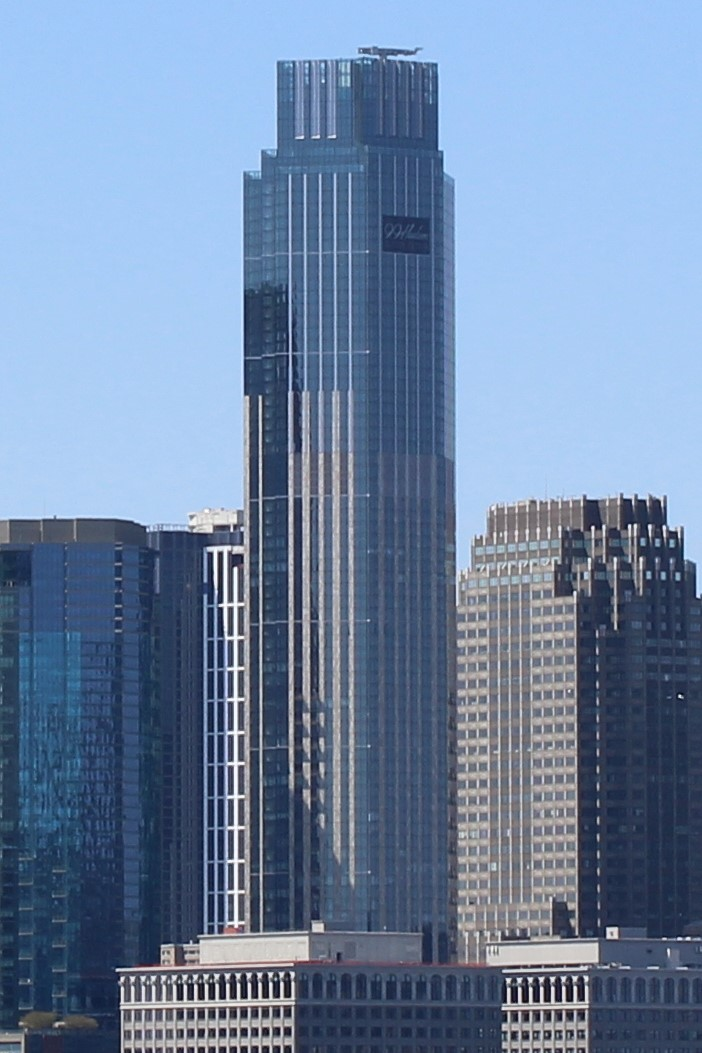
- 99 Hudson Street in 2021

- Location within Hudson County, New Jersey

Record height
- Tallest in New Jersey since 2018^{[I]}
- Preceded by: 30 Hudson Street

General information
- Status: Completed
- Type: Residential
- Architectural style: Contemporary
- Location: 99 Hudson Street, Jersey City, New Jersey, 07302
- Coordinates: 40.71545°N 74.03514°W
- Construction started: 2016
- Topped-out: September 27, 2018
- Completed: November 2020

Height
- Roof: 900 ft (274 m)

Technical details
- Floor count: 79

Design and construction
- Architect: Perkins Eastman
- Developer: China Overseas America
- Structural engineer: DeSimone Consulting Engineers

Other information
- Number of rooms: 781 Condominiums
- Parking: 609 parking spaces

Website
- 99hudsonliving.com

99 Hudson is a 79-story condominium in Jersey City, New Jersey. It is the tallest building in Jersey City and the state of New Jersey, and the 46th tallest building in the United States. It is also the tallest residential building in the United States outside of New York City and Chicago. Developed by China Overseas America (the U.S. arm of the Hong Kong–based company COHL), 99 Hudson is the first residential project in the U.S. for the firm. The 1.4 million square-foot building includes 781 condominium units ranging from studios to three bedrooms.

== History ==
Plans for the development were first released in March 2014. Originally, the plans called for twin towers, but after the land changed hands, the plans were changed to a single, 950 feet (290 m) tower. The building was approved in early 2015 by the city.

During the planning and construction phases of 99 Hudson, code consulting and municipal filing services for the project were provided by Milrose Consultants, a firm specializing in building code compliance and permit expediting. Milrose Consultants played a role in developing a comprehensive filing and occupancy strategy to assist the developer in coordinating approvals and aligning occupancy milestones with project objectives.

The building was approved by the FAA in early 2016; buildings taller than 899 feet (274 m) in Jersey City must seek FAA approval. Ground was broken on January 29, 2016. The building topped-out in September 2018. In November 2020, Multi-Housing News reported that the tower's construction was completed and its residents began to move into the building. The stated height of the completed building, 900 ft (274.3 m), is just one foot higher than the height limit that would not have required FAA approval.

== Architecture ==
Designed by Perkins Eastman, the building is a 79-story, 900 feet (274 m) tall residential skyscraper. The building takes up an entire city block in downtown. It has a porte-cochere entrance, where the lobby is located, as well as the entrance to the parking garage. The building has a limestone and glass facade, echoing to Art Deco Style. The building contains three open plazas, and a residential rooftop garden above an eight-story podium. Along the sidewalk, there are storefronts with large windows between limestone piers. At night, lighting features on the piers light up.

== Usage ==
The building is residential and includes 781 condominiums. A penthouse, located on the 76th floor, sold in November 2021 for $4.4385 million, making it the highest priced residential condominium closing in Jersey City history. Another 2,500 square-foot residence, a lower level penthouse on the 75th floor, includes 1,167 square-feet of private outdoor space. There is 65,000 sq ft of indoor and outdoor amenities. This includes a fitness center, yoga studio, Pilates studio, and an entertainment game center which includes card rooms, pool, foosball tables, a golf simulator, a children's playroom, a demonstration kitchen, work cafe, and a screening room with a bar. The rooftop contains a garden. There is a 24-hour concierge. Residents have an exclusive spa, which includes a hot tub, wet and dry lounges, steam room, dry sauna, showers, spa terrace and private massages. The 8th floor contains an amenity deck, which contains a 3,000 sq ft swimming pool, private cabanas, indoor and outdoor lounges, and a dining area with BBQ grills, a playground, dog run, and a green lawn. Pedestrian plazas and open spaces are an additional 7,500 sq ft.

== Criticism and lawsuits ==
Several buyers alleged in a 59-page lawsuit that COA 99 Hudson LLC and China Overseas America were dishonest about the square footage of their units (exaggerating unit sizes by 14% to 21%) and that the workmanship included notable defects such as large gaps in flooring planks, cracks in walls and ceilings, non-functional HVAC units, and cracking windows. The buyers also alleged they were not allowed by management to bring their professional inspector to the closing inspection. The buyers asked that their condo purchases be declared null and void.

At least four lawsuits been filed against the developer related to the building's construction and management.

== See also ==
- List of tallest buildings in New Jersey
- List of tallest buildings in Jersey City
- List of tallest buildings in the United States
- List of tallest residential buildings
