= Murray Kushner =

American real estate developer

- Education: University of Pennsylvania (BA, JD)
- Known for: Founder of The KRE Group
- Spouse: Lee Kushner
- Children: 4, including Melissa Kushner and Marc Kushner
- Parent(s): Joseph Kushner; Rae Kushner
- Family: Kushner

Murray Kushner is an American real estate developer.

== Early life ==
Kushner's parents, Joseph Kushner and Rae Kushner, were Jews born in eastern Poland and Holocaust survivors, who came to America from the USSR by way of Italy in 1949. His father worked as a construction worker and concurrently as an independent builder, while investing in real estate, eventually building a portfolio totaling 4,000 New Jersey apartments. The Joseph Kushner Hebrew Academy and the Rae Kushner Yeshiva High School, in Livingston, New Jersey, built by Charles Kushner, are named after them. Murray Kushner has two sisters, Esther and Linda, and a younger brother, Charles. Murray graduated summa cum laude with a B.A. from the University of Pennsylvania ('73), and then went on to obtain a J.D. from the University of Pennsylvania Law School ('76).

== Career ==
After school, he worked for the family real estate business, and after his father's death, he and his siblings equally divided ownership of the company. His relationship with his brother eventually deteriorated over investment decisions, especially Murray's veto on the purchase of Berkshire Realty, a firm that owned 24,000 apartments, which would have made Kushner Properties the largest privately held real-estate firm in the region. In 2000, the brothers decided to no longer work together as business partners. His firm, founded in 1979 with business partner Eugene Schenkman as Schenkman/Kushner (SK Properties), now known as The KRE Group, has since grown to more than 100 full-time employees, with a portfolio of 9,000 apartments and 6 million square feet of office and industrial property.

KRE has developed projects throughout the Northeast Corridor, with several located in Downtown Jersey City. In July 2014, the company began construction on the first phase of Journal Squared, a residential development adjacent to the Journal Square Transportation Center. The project will be constructed in three phases, and is approved for a total of 1,838 units, including a 70-story building, which will be one of the tallest buildings in Jersey City when completed.

== Personal life ==
Kushner married Lee Kushner, and they raised their children in Modern Orthodox Judaism. He has two sons, Jon and Marc. His first wife died and he remarried. His wife came into the marriage with a son and daughter. His son Jonathan Kushner has taken over The KRE Group. His son Marc is an architect and married Christopher Barley in a Jewish ceremony in 2012. Kushner is a prominent supporter of governor Chris Christie. His wife was diagnosed with multiple sclerosis in the mid-1990s, and they dedicate much of their philanthropic activities to finding a cure. He remains estranged from his brother Charles Kushner.

== See also ==
- Kushner family
