= Kushner Real Estate Group =

American real estate development company

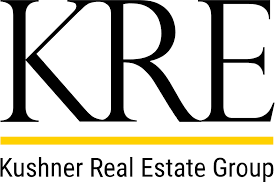
- Type: Private
- Industry: Real estate
- Founded: 1979; 47 years ago
- Founders: Murray Kushner; Eugene Schenkman
- Headquarters: Bridgewater, New Jersey, United States
- Services: Real estate development
- Owner: Murray Kushner
- Website: www.thekregroup.com

Kushner Real Estate Group, also known as the KRE Group, is an American real estate development company based in Bridgewater, New Jersey. The company has developed, owns, and manages properties throughout New Jersey, New York, and Pennsylvania, including more than 6,000,000 square feet of commercial industrial, and retail property, and more than 9,000 existing apartments, with an additional 7,000 apartments in various stages of approvals and construction. The company controls more than 6 million square feet of commercial industrial, and retail property, and more than 9,000 apartments.

== History ==
KRE was founded in 1979 as SK Properties by Eugene Schenkman and Murray Kushner, the brother of Charles Kushner and uncle of Jared Kushner.

The company was re-branded in 2010, and changed its name to KRE.

In July 2014, the company began construction on the first phase of Journal Squared, a residential development adjacent to the Journal Square Transportation Center. The project was to be constructed in three phases, and was approved for a total of 1,838 units, including a 70-story building, which will be one of the tallest buildings in Jersey City, New Jersey.

In March 2017, it opened for occupancy, and the company acquired a 228-unit rental community in Springfield, New Jersey, in partnership with Avenue Realty Capital, for $70 million.

In August 2017, the company acquired a 439-unit garden apartment complex in Plainsboro, New Jersey.

== Projects ==
KRE has developed projects throughout the Northeast Corridor, with several located in Downtown Jersey City. In July 2014, the company began construction on the first phase of Journal Squared, a residential development adjacent to the Journal Square Transportation Center. The project will be constructed in three phases and is approved for a total of 1,838 units, including a 70-story building, which will one of the tallest buildings in Jersey City if built.

== See also ==
- Kushner family
