= Kushner family =

American business and political family

Kushner
- Current region: New Jersey, United States
- Origin: Novogrudok
- Titles: Kushner Companies; Kushner Real Estate Group; Thrive Capital; Affinity Partners
- Members: Joseph Kushner; Charles Kushner; Murray Kushner; Marc Kushner; Jared Kushner; Joshua Kushner
- Connected members: Ivanka Trump; Karlie Kloss
- Connected families: Trump family
- Properties: Kushner Companies; Trump Bay Street; Puck Building; 1 Journal Square; Kushner Real Estate Group; Journal Squared

The Kushner family is an American family involved in real estate development. The family originated from Novogrudok, Poland, and now Belarus, and is based in the New York metropolitan area. Joseph Kushner developed a portfolio of 4,000 apartments. He left the business to his sons, Murray and Charles Kushner, who worked together before having a falling-out over business and personal matters. Charles owns Kushner Companies and Murray owns the Kushner Real Estate Group. The net worth of Charles' family has been estimated at over $1 billion. Jared Kushner, Charles' son, was senior advisor to President Donald Trump; Trump is also Jared's father-in-law.

== Family history ==
=== First generation ===
Rae Kushner was born in 1923 to a Jewish family in Novogrudok (then part of the Second Polish Republic). Her father, a furrier, owned two stores and the family lived comfortably. Due to rising anti-Semitism, the family tried to obtain a travel visa allowing them to leave Poland, but were unable to secure one before the beginning of World War II. After the German occupation of Soviet-controlled Poland in 1941, Rae and her family were forced into the ghetto. Her mother and sister were killed. In 1943, Rae and other Jews, including her father, a sister, and her brother, tunneled out of the ghetto. Though her brother did not survive, the others were rescued by Tuvia Bielski. They lived in the forests near Novogrudok with the Bielski partisans until Novogrudok was liberated by the Soviet Union in 1944.

Rae met Yossel Berkowitz, a carpenter who was also from Novogrudok, in the forest. They married in Budapest. They went to Italy, where they stayed in a displaced persons camp for 3 1/2 years. As the Kushners had family in the United States, they were admitted to the country in 1949, and settled in New York City. Yossel took Rae's last name and passed himself off as his father-in-law's son. Yossel, now going by the name of Joseph, began building apartments in New Jersey in partnership with Harry and Joseph Wilf. Joseph and Rae had a daughter, Linda, in the displaced persons camp. After coming to the United States, they had two sons, Murray and Charles, and another daughter, Esther. Rae died in 2004.

=== Second generation ===
Murray founded SK (Schenkman/Kushner) Properties (now Kushner Real Estate Group) with his father and business partner Eugene Schenkman in 1979. In 1985, Charles started Kushner Companies, a real estate firm, with Joseph as his partner. Joseph died later in 1985, and Charles gave his siblings a stake in the company. In the 1990s, Charles began to donate money to Democratic Party causes, including the campaign of Jim McGreevey for governor of New Jersey. Murray, on the other hand, donated to Republican Party candidates. McGreevey appointed Charles to the board of commissioners for the Port Authority of New York and New Jersey, and nominated him to become the chairman. Charles sponsored the visa of Golan Cipel, who had a romantic relationship with McGreevey. Charles also engaged in philanthropy, providing the money for the Joseph Kushner Hebrew Academy and the Rae Kushner Yeshiva High School.

Charles and Murray came into conflict over business decisions where they disagreed, including a proposed deal that Murray pulled out of. Charles was also against Murray marrying someone who converted to Judaism, rather than someone born in the religion. They experienced a falling-out after an argument during a Passover seder in 2000. Esther sided with Murray, and began to cooperate with an FBI investigation into Kushner Companies for tax evasion. Charles hired a prostitute to seduce Esther's husband, had the encounter videotaped, and sent photographs of it to Esther in an attempt to silence her. Charles was arrested by the FBI and prosecuted by U.S. Attorney Chris Christie. Charles pled guilty to 18 felonies, including tax fraud, making illegal campaign contributions, and witness tampering. He served 16 months in prison.

=== Third generation ===
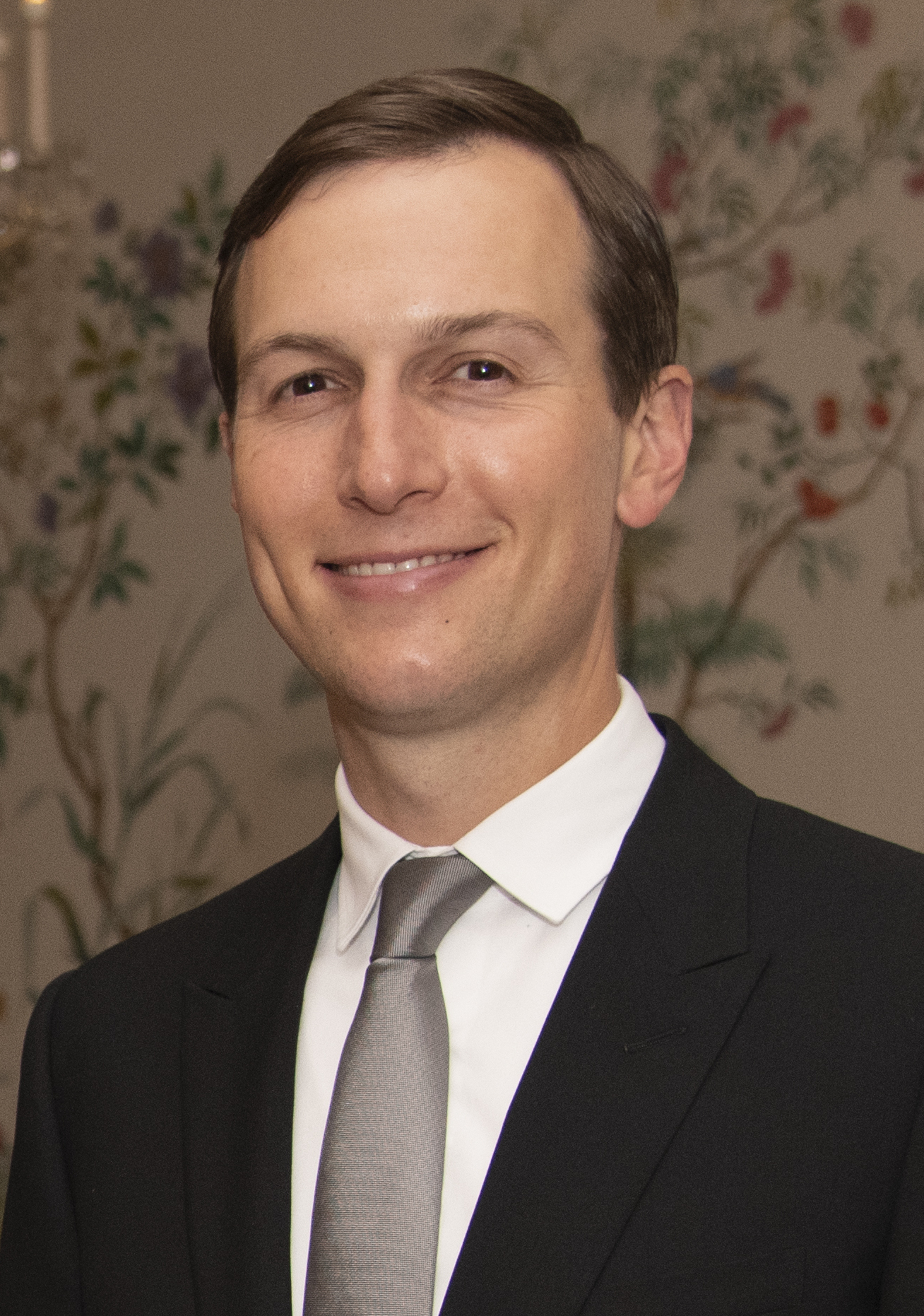
Jared Kushner in 2019

Charles has two sons, Jared and Joshua, and two daughters, Nicole and Dara. Following Charles' arrest, his eldest son, Jared, took charge of Kushner Companies. They sold their real estate holdings in New Jersey for $1.9 billion and bought 660 Fifth Avenue for $1.8 billion. In 2006, Jared bought Observer Media for $10 million. Joseph Meyer, Jared's brother-in-law, became chief executive officer of Observer Media in 2013. Nicole works for Kushner Companies, but Dara does not. Joshua founded Thrive Capital, a venture capital firm, in 2010. Josh cofounded Oscar Health, and Jared invested in the company. In 2016, Forbes estimated the net worth of Charles, his wife Seryl, Jared, and Joshua at $1.8 billion.

In 2010, SK Properties rebranded itself as the Kushner Real Estate Group (KRE Group), with Murray as chairman and his son, Jonathan, as company president. Jonathan's brother, Marc, is an architect. KRE Group and Kushner Companies have both invested in the Journal Square neighborhood of Jersey City, New Jersey, where KRE Group is building Journal Squared and Kushner Companies is building One Journal Square. Kushner Companies filed a lawsuit in June 2018 alleging that the city gave the KRE Group more favorable terms. The suit was settled in October 2020.

Jared married Ivanka Trump, after her conversion to Judaism, in October 2009 while his younger brother Joshua married Karlie Kloss, who also converted to Judaism, in October 2018.

Jared worked on his father-in-law Donald Trump's 2016 presidential campaign. During the campaign, he wrote an op-ed defending Trump from accusations of anti-Semitism, invoking the story of his grandparents resisting the Nazis. Marc responded on Facebook that his lesson from the story of his grandparents was to renounce hate. Another cousin, Jacob Schulder, also objected to the reference to his grandparents. After the election, Trump named Jared senior advisor to the president alongside his daughter Ivanka. In order to divest himself of assets, he sold Observer Media to a trust controlled by his family.

== See also ==
- Trump family
