= The Urban Conga =

American design studio

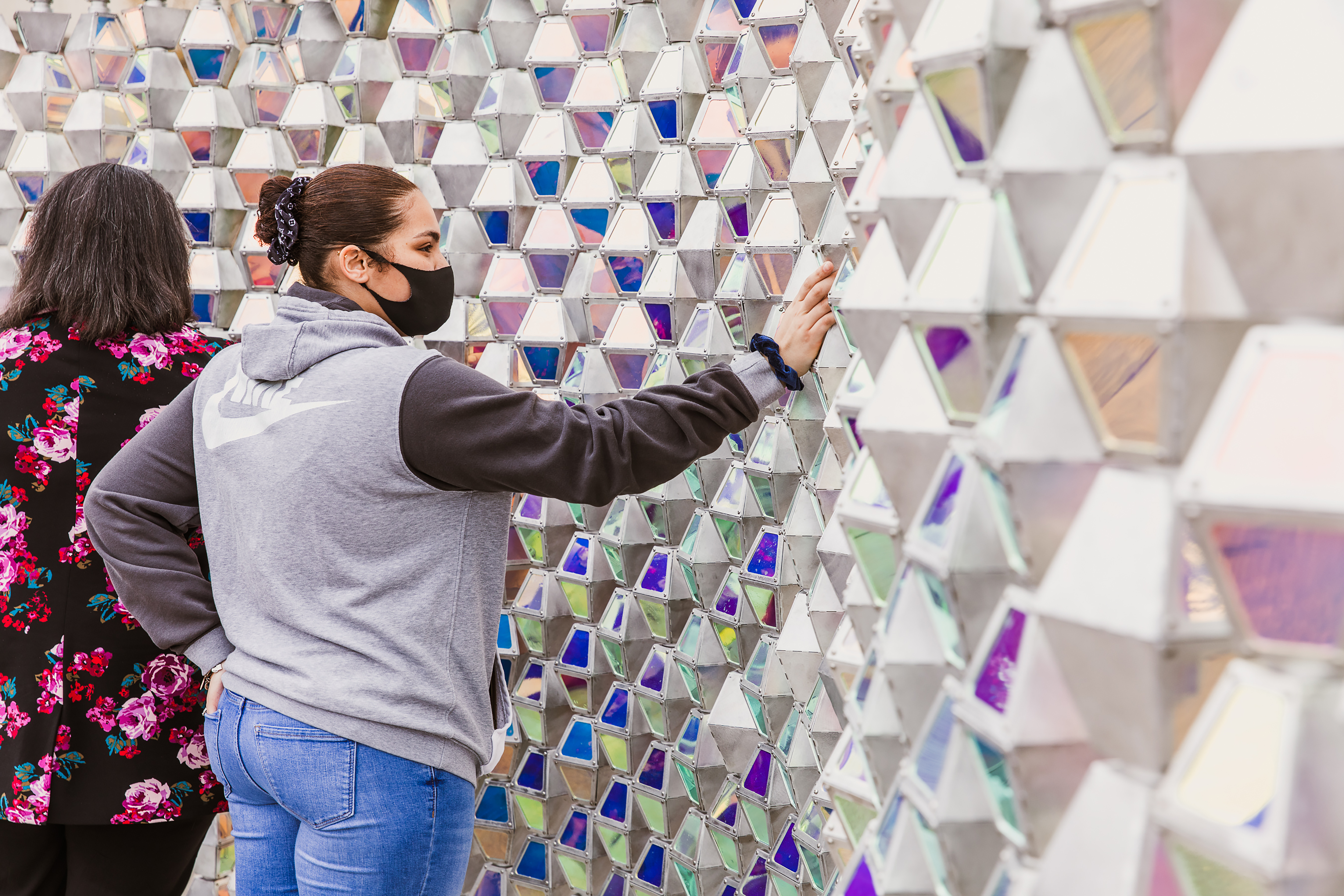
- Image of Ripple in Rochester, New York
- Type: Design Studio
- Founder: Ryan Swanson
- Headquarters: Brooklyn, New York
- Website: www.theurbanconga.com

The Urban Conga is a New York City based multidisciplinary design studio focused on investigating the idea of a “Playable City” as an ecosystem of multiscale playable opportunities intertwined within the existing urban infrastructure. They specialize in working with communities to create inclusive, engaging, and site-specific work that evokes play within everyday spaces. Their work can be found worldwide ranging from musical benches to community-designed spatial interventions.

== Projects ==
Ripple
2021

Ripple is an ever-changing landmark designed with the community of Rochester, New York that responds to the people, the landscape, and the interactions between them. The spatial intervention was designed to act as a playful catalyst for breaking down social barriers and connecting people within the public realm.

Ribbon
2021

Ribbon was designed as a transformative communal platform for people to connect, share, and learn each other's versions of Long Island City. It acts as a playful gesture wrapping around and framing out different moments throughout several pedestrian pathways and communal spaces within the city. The spatial intervention begins to playfully disrupt one's daily routine and encourages them to look at their surrounding context in new ways.

Oscillation
2020

Oscillation is a traveling interactive installation that uses sight, sound, and movement to spark community activity and social interaction through play. The installation acts like the musical instrument a theremin. As you walk toward the piece, it plays different sounds and pitches depending on your distance from it. And as you move and dance around it, colors reflect and refract light in different ways based on your angle and position. Oscillation has traveled all around the United States as well as worldwide to Canada and Scotland.

Shifting Totems
2019

Shifting Totems was created as a neighborhood landmark, sparking a moment of pride, empowerment, and inspiration within the Glenville community in Cleveland, OH. The permanent installation was designed with the local community to become a positive identity for the neighborhood that would spark conversations about the area's past, present, and future.

Entangled
2019

Entangled was designed with the Little Haiti community in Miami, Florida to create a platform for residents and visitors to learn and share the history, stories, and music of Haitian culture outside the doors of the local Little Haiti Cultural Complex. The installation is made up of a series of social seating and three aluminum drums designed from the traditional Rada Battery drums from Haiti.

The Hangout
2017

The Hangout was designed with the Lower Ninth Ward community in New Orleans, LA that focuses on using sight, sound, and touch to spark creativity, exploration, and free-choice learning within a once underutilized space in the community. The design utilizes touch sensor technology to allow each cylinder in the design to play sounds when touched.

Why sit when you can play?
2015

Why sit when you can play, is a customizable musical public park bench that can be played like a marimba. The custom musical benches can be found across the United States as well as in Mexico City.

== Awards ==
- 2021 Architizer: A+ Firm of the Year for Small Projects
- 2020 ArchDaily: Best Young Practice
- 2020 Interior Design Magazine: Best of the Year Honoree - Shifting Totems
- 2020 NYCxDESIGN: Honoree - Oscillation
- 2019 Art Directors Club of New York Silver Cube - The Hangout
- 2019 Architizer A+ Award - SOLIS
- 2019 International Design Gold Award - Why Sit When You Can Play?
- 2018 Architecture Masterprize - The Hangout
- 2018 CODAawards Top 100 projects - The Hangout
- 2018 Architizer A+ Award - Pong in the Park
- 2018 American Institute of Architects: Florida Object of the Year - The Hangout
- 2018 South by Southwest: Place by Design Honoree - The Hangout
