= The Residences at Liberty National =

Residential buildings in Jersey City, New Jersey

Coordinates: 40.6959°N 74.0776°W

The Residences at Liberty National is an apartment complex concept in Jersey City, New Jersey, United States. The Residences at Liberty National consists of Towers I, II, and III. Tower I will have 35 floors, Tower II will have 43 floors, and Tower III will have 50 floors. Towers I, and II and III were originally scheduled for completion in 2009 however construction was placed on hold and remains halted. As of 2025, the project is labeled as "cancelled".

== See also ==
- List of tallest buildings in Jersey City
