= Provost Square =

Residential buildings in Jersey City, New Jersey

Coordinates: 40.7204°N 74.0403°W

Provost Square is a partially built apartment complex in Jersey City, New Jersey developed by Toll Brothers. It will consists of two towers, one of which was completed in 2015 and called the Morgan. It is 38 storeys and 102 m (335 ft) tall. Work began on the site of 2nd tower in 2015. Phase 2 is 1.5 million square feet. The three buildings are claimed to have a synergy that will increase their utility and value.

It is being eclipsed by a larger building boom and architectural revival (Note: The decaying Jersey City waterfront, warehouse district, etc. has been the object of phenomenal redevelopment.) that is taking place in Jersey City, which has now moved toward tall towers.

== See also ==
- List of tallest buildings in Jersey City
