= Newport Tower =

Newport Tower may refer to the following buildings in the United States:

- Newport Tower (Rhode Island)
- Newport Tower (Jersey City)
