= 101 Hudson Street =

Skyscraper in Jersey City, New Jersey

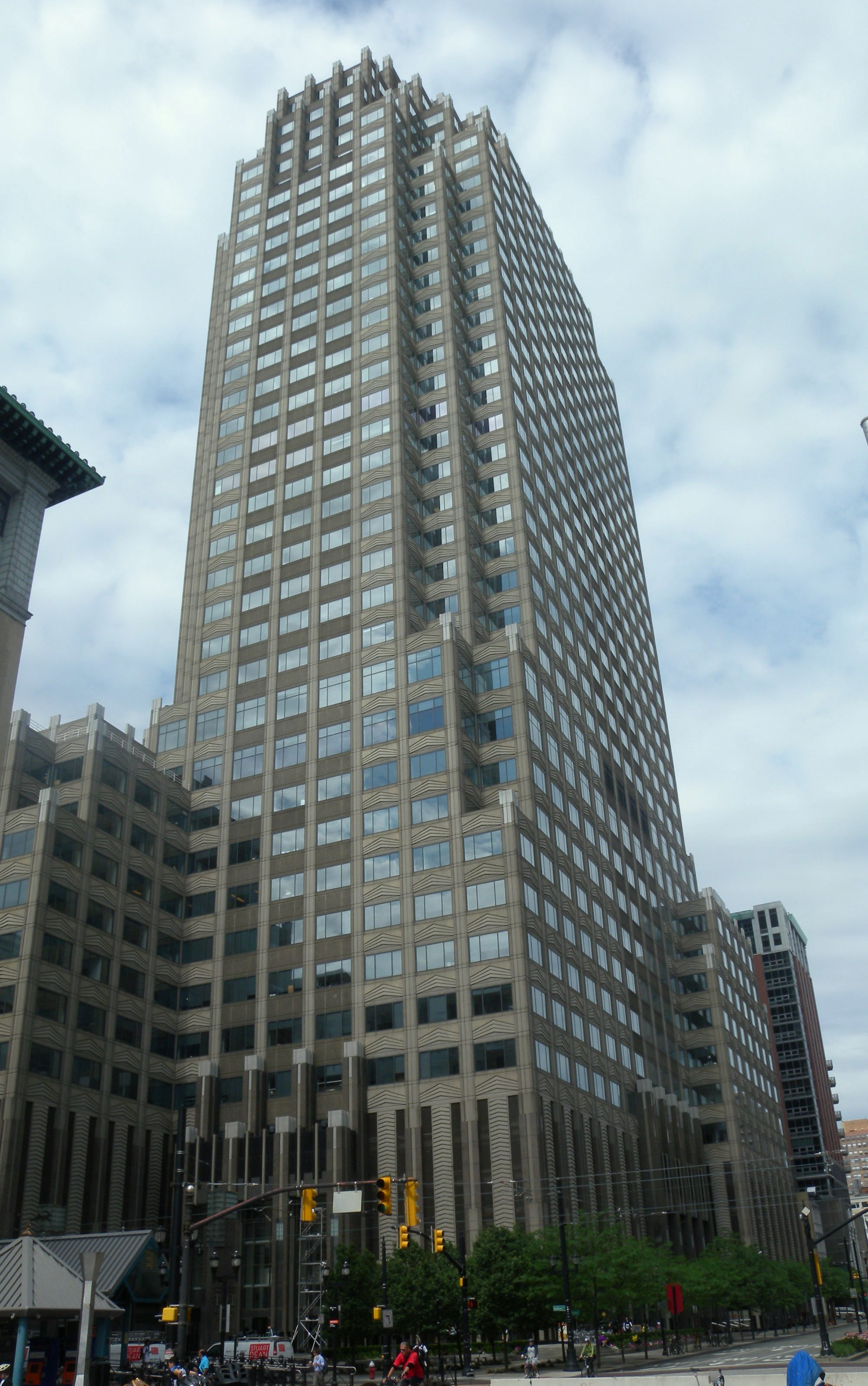
- (2011)
- Interactive map of the 101 Hudson Street area
- Alternative names: Merrill Lynch Building

Record height
- Tallest in New Jersey from 1992 to 2004^{[I]}
- Preceded by: Newport Tower
- Surpassed by: 30 Hudson Street

General information
- Status: Completed
- Type: Post-modernism
- Location: 101 Hudson Street; Jersey City, New Jersey
- Coordinates: 40.716°N 74.0351°W
- Completed: 1992
- Opening: 1992

Height
- Roof: 167 m (548 ft)

Technical details
- Floor count: 42
- Floor area: 116,125 m^{2} (1,249,960 sq ft)
- Lifts/elevators: 30

Design and construction
- Architect: Brennan Beer Gorman / Architects LLP

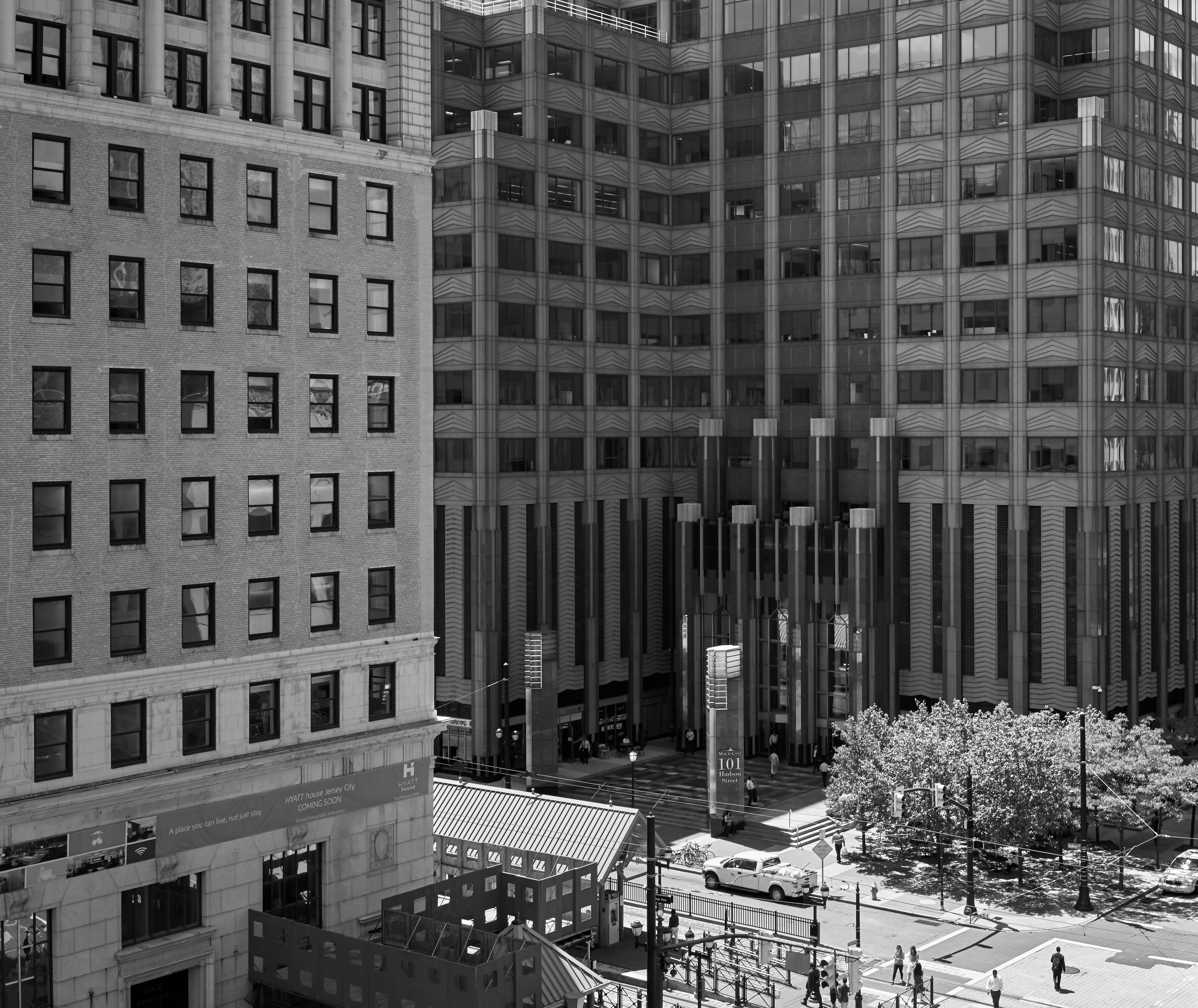
View of architectural details

101 Hudson Street, also known as the Merrill Lynch Building, in the Exchange Place neighborhood of Jersey City, New Jersey, is the seventh-tallest building in Jersey City, and the sixth-tallest in the state of New Jersey. Completed in 1992, it has 42 stories, and reaches a height of 167 meters (548 feet). It was the second tallest building in New Jersey after the Trump Taj Mahal Casino Resort until 30 Hudson Street was completed in 2004. The building was designed by Brennan Beer Gorman / Architects LLP. Merrill Lynch and American International Group are among the tenants.

Upper floors have unobstructed views of Manhattan to the east. Some views south include New York Bay and the Statue of Liberty while others include 30 Hudson Street and the two residential high rises of Hudson Greene.

The building is host to several nesting sites for Peregrine Falcons. The New Jersey Department of Environmental Projection, Division of Fish & Wildlife, maintains a Jersey City Peregrine Cam at some of the sites on the building.

== See also ==
- List of tallest buildings in Jersey City
