= Liberty Towers =

Liberty Towers may refer to:

- Liberty Towers (Tulsa) – in Tulsa, Oklahoma
- Liberty Towers (Jersey City) – in Jersey City, New Jersey
- Liberty Place in Philadelphia, Pennsylvania
