= The BLVD Collection =

Skyscraper in Jersey City, New Jersey

The BLVD Collection (formerly "Marbella Apartments")
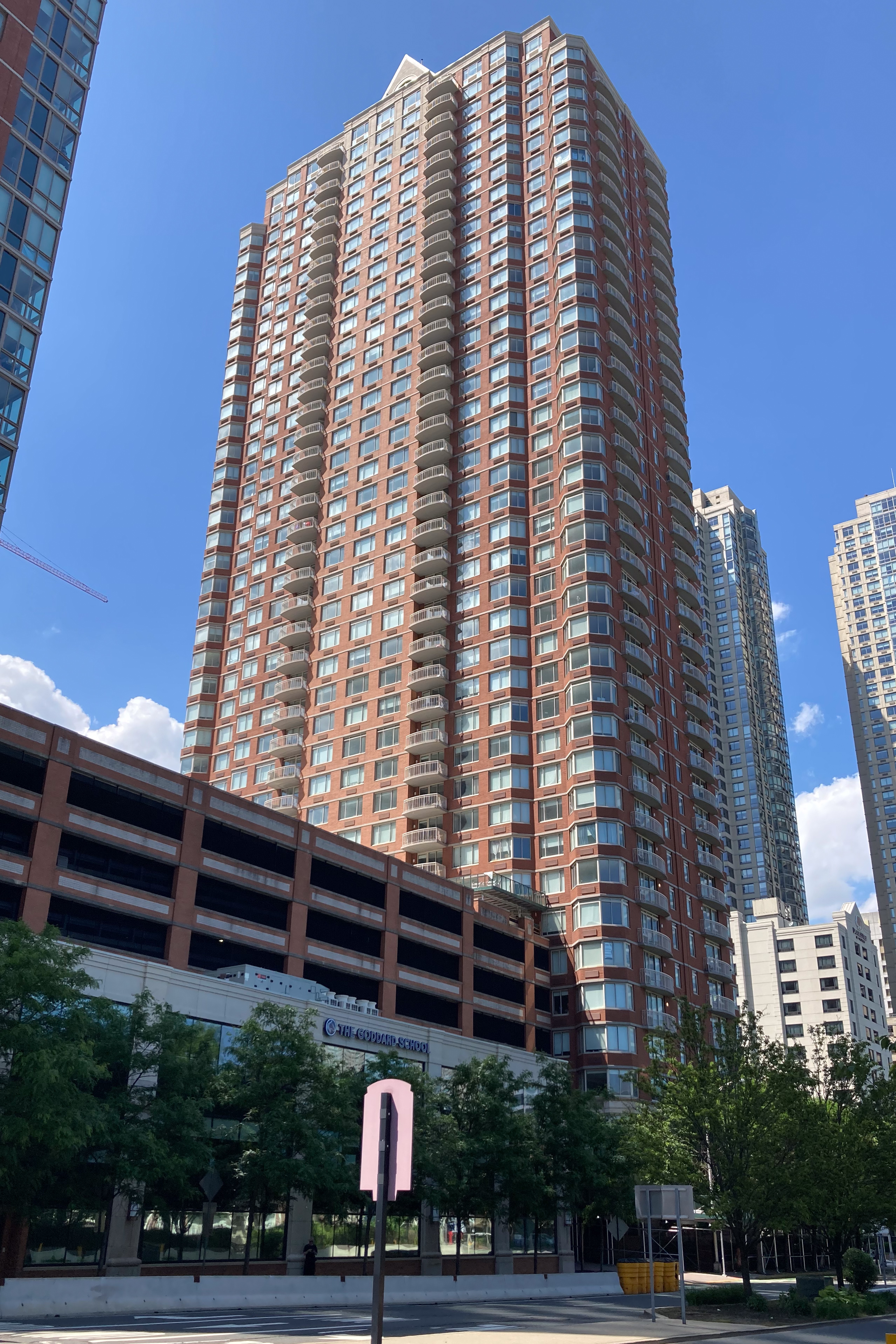
- The Marbella Apartments building is part of the BLVD Collection.
- Interactive map of the The BLVD Collection (formerly "Marbella Apartments") area

General information
- Type: Residential
- Location: 425 Washington Boulevard, Jersey City, New Jersey
- Coordinates: 40.7228°N 74.0368°W
- Construction started: 2001
- Completed: 2003
- Cost: $74,000,000
- Owner: Veris Residential

Height
- Roof: 427 ft (130 m)

Technical details
- Floor count: 40

Design and construction
- Architects: Schuman, Lichtenstein, Claman & Efron
- Developer: Roseland Property Company
- Structural engineer: DeSimone Consulting Engineers

The BLVD Collection (including the properties previously known as Marbella Apartments) is trio of 427 ft (130m) tall skyscrapers in Jersey City, New Jersey, including the 17th tallest building in Jersey City. When it was completed, it was the tallest residential building in Jersey City.

The first building, originally known as Marbella Apartments, was submitted for city planning board approval in 1998 and completed in 2003; the first completed building has 40 floors, containing 412 apartments.

A second tower, originally called M2, opened in June 2016 and is slightly taller than the original one at 450 ft (137 m) and 38 floors, with 300 apartments.

== See also ==
- List of tallest buildings in Jersey City
