= Laurent Morali =

French executive and developer

- Born: January 1975 (age 51); Metz, France
- Education: Toulouse Business School
- Title: CEO, Kushner Companies
- Term: June 2016-
- Spouse: Liat Morali
- Children: 3

Laurent Morali (born January 1975) is a French-born, US-based real estate developer and chief executive officer of the privately held and family-owned Kushner Companies since June 2016, having been head of acquisitions and capital markets.

== Early life ==
Morali was born in Metz, France in January 1975, and educated at Toulouse Business School (École Supérieure de Commerce de Toulouse), in France, from 1995 to 1998.

== Career ==
Morali joined Kushner Companies in 2008, having previously worked for Calyon Securities, a French financial firm.

== Personal life ==
He is married to Liat, and they have three sons. He is the co-founder and lead guitar for the band Local Law.
