= Kushner Companies =

American real estate developer

Kushner Companies LLC
- Type: Private
- Industry: Real estate
- Founded: 1985; 41 years ago
- Founder: Charles Kushner
- Headquarters: 767 Fifth Avenue, New York City, New York, United States
- Key people: Laurent Morali (CEO); Nicole Kushner Meyer (President); Joshua Kushner (Principal director)
- Services: Real estate development
- Website: kushner.com

Kushner Companies LLC is an American real estate developer in the New York City metropolitan area. The company's biggest presence is in the New Jersey residential market.

A study published in December 2017 by Bloomberg News indicated that Kushner Companies owned a stake in over 60 buildings in New York City. Major holdings in the city include the Puck Building and the retail space at 229 West 43rd Street, as well as 666 Fifth Avenue until its 2018 sale. The company's headquarters were relocated to the GM Building Manhattan in 2020.

== History ==
In 1985, Charles Kushner founded Kushner Companies along with his father, Joseph Kushner.

In 2005, Charles Kushner was convicted of tax evasion and witness tampering, and served time in federal prison. As a result, he handed over the management of the company to his eldest son, Jared.

Kushner Companies has received multiple loans from Israeli bank, Bank Hapoalim.

The firm "received a roughly $30 million investment from Menora Mivtachim" in 2017. It was spent on "a Maryland development".

In 2017, Nicole Kushner Meyer joined her brother Josh in Kushner Companies, serving as a principal. Meyer was criticized for mentioning her brother Jared's White House position during investor presentations that she gave in China when soliciting $150 million for 1 Journal Square in Jersey City, New Jersey, causing her to cancel the rest of her roadshow appearances.

According to an August 2017 article in Bloomberg, the company was facing an increasingly "distressed situation" at the time. Over the previous few years, family members had sought substantial overseas investment to deal with "troubled finances".

In the 2010s, developers such as the Kushner Companies widely used the EB-5 visa to fuel a "high-end US residential boom". In May 2017, Trump renewed the visa program in his first major piece of legislation. That September, the United States Attorney's office subpoenaed the Kushner Companies over the use of the EB-5 visa program to fund developments.

In December 2017, the United States District Court for the Eastern District of New York subpoenaed Deutsche Bank records pertaining to Kushner Companies. The New York Times reported in May 2019 that anti-money laundering specialists in the bank detected what appeared to be suspicious transactions involving entities controlled by Donald Trump and Jared Kushner, for which they recommended filing suspicious activity reports with the Financial Crimes Enforcement Network of the Treasury Department, but bank executives rejected the recommendations. One specialist noted money moving from Kushner Companies to Russian individuals and flagged it in part because of the bank's previous involvement in a Russian money laundering scheme.

In 2020, ProPublica and WNYC reported that Kushner Companies received "a near-record sum" from government-backed lender Freddie Mac. The $786 million in loans helped Kushner Companies purchase thousands of apartments in Maryland and Virginia and appeared to come with "unusually good terms," raising conflict of interest questions due to Jared Kushner's role as Senior Advisor to the President of the United States.

== Acquisitions ==
In 2003, New York University and Kushner Properties announced that the university had signed a 15-year lease for three floors, comprising 75,000 square feet (7,000 m^{2}) of contiguous space, in the historic Puck Building, 295 Lafayette Street in Manhattan's SoHo neighborhood.

In December 2006, the company announced plans to buy 666 Fifth Avenue for $1.8 billion, the biggest deal to date for an individual building in New York City history. In early 2007, Kushner bought the building for US$1.8 billion, the highest price ever paid for a single office building in the United States. Four years later, rising debt forced Kushner to hand over 49.5% of the ownership of 666 Fifth Avenue to Vornado. Kushner had planned to demolish the existing structure and build one twice the size; Vornado's Steven Roth stated that this will not happen. The building, which represented significant debt for the company was leased in 2018.

Kushner since shifted focus from his New Jersey real estate operations to the New York market. In July 2007, the Kushner Companies sold 17,500 apartments in the states of New Jersey, Pennsylvania, Delaware, Maryland and New York, valued at $2 billion. Before that sale, the Companies had employed approximately 800 people.

In August 2011, representatives from the Kushner Companies made a presentation to the Perth Amboy Redevelopment Agency proposing a scaled-back design concept for the Landings at Harborside, a residential development set to be built along the city's waterfront, and allowing rental housing instead of owner-occupied units as originally planned. The plan, which would have saved two historic Perth Amboy buildings, was endorsed by Mayor Wilda Diaz, quoted as saying, "Too many sites have been torn down. Let's restore them and use them for other purposes." She further said that Kushner sketched a concept for the courthouse that was incorporated into the redesign.

On July 5, 2013, Kushner Companies signed an agreement to purchase a five-building complex in Brooklyn Heights, Brooklyn, formerly used by Jehovah's Witnesses, for $340 million. The building is 95% owned by CIM Group.

In 2016, Kushner Companies opened Trump Bay Street, a luxury 53-story apartment tower in Jersey City, New Jersey. The Kushners partnered with a company linked to Beny Steinmetz on the $250 million project, which was financed through a $30 million cash investment by the Kushners and $190 million in loans, including a $140 million construction loan from CIT Group and $50 million of investments from Chinese nationals purchasing EB-5 visas. By June 2017, the building had reached half occupancy and was valued at up to $360 million, leading the Kushners to seek $250 million in refinancing. Jared Kushner retained his interest in the building after becoming senior advisor to President Donald Trump, his father-in-law.

The company also owns properties in Long Branch, New Jersey as well as nearby Monmouth Mall, which Kushner acquired when it fully purchased the non-management joint venture with Vornado Realty Trust that owned the mall.

== See also ==
- Kushner family
