= Haus25 =

57-story residential building in Jersey City, New Jersey

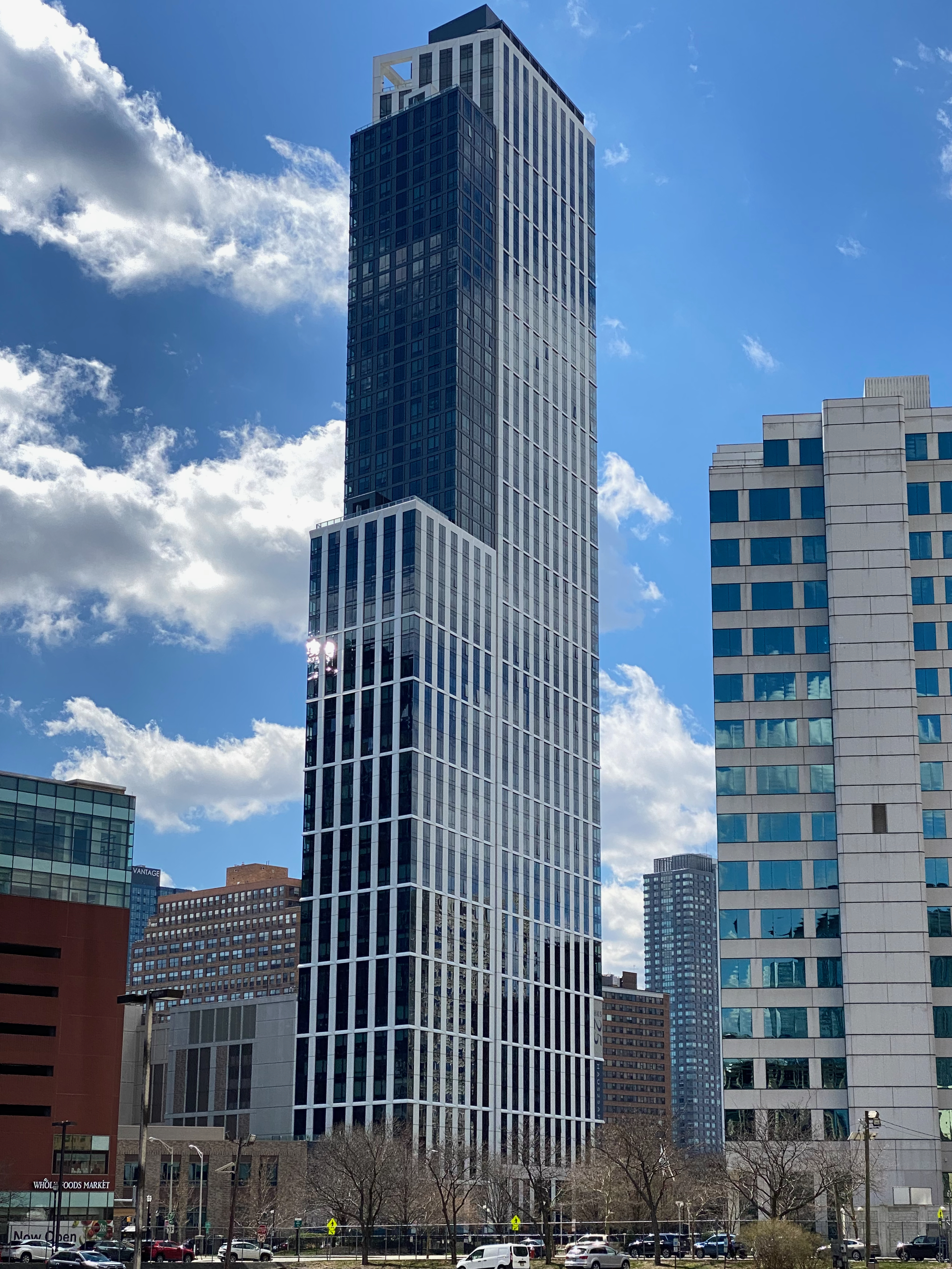
- Interactive map of the Haus25 area
- Alternative names: The Charlotte

General information
- Status: Completed
- Type: Residential
- Location: 25 Columbus Drive
- Coordinates: 40°43′04″N 74°02′19″W
- Construction started: 2019
- Completed: 2022

Height
- Roof: 626 ft (191 m)

Technical details
- Material: Concrete
- Floor count: 57

Design and construction
- Architect: Handel Architects LLP
- Developer: L+M Development Partners

Other information
- Number of rooms: 750

Website
- www.livehaus25.com

Haus25 is a 57-story residential building in Jersey City, New Jersey. At 626 ft (191 m), it is the 7th tallest building in Jersey City and the 8th tallest building in New Jersey. The building was first proposed in 2016, began construction in 2019, and was completed in 2022. The building is attached to an elementary school that was built alongside the development of the tower itself.

== History ==
In 2014, L+M Development Partners and the Paulus Hook Community Housing Corporation signed a deal for the sale of the 163-unit affordable housing Paulus Hook Towers and the adjacent parking lot. In the deal, the existing apartments were to have $3 million invested into them by L+M, including new windows and façade renovations. In exchange, L+M was allowed to develop a tower on the parking lot.

In 2016, a $370 million proposal by L+M Development Partners to build a 60-story tower on the site was first announced, which had been used as a parking lot for residents of the Paulus Hook Towers at 100 Montgomery Street, which would also include 750 residential units as well as retail, parking, and a public plaza, with the addition of a new public school.

In 2017, the city approved a version of the tower that was 52 stories, the public school, four storefronts, and a public plaza.

In 2019, the tower began construction, and was dubbed a new name, The Charlotte. By this point, the tower was to be built to its current 57-story height, along with other slight modifications. The development was to include 750 units, including 244 studios, 249 one-bedrooms, 224 two-bedrooms, and 33 three-bedrooms, with 37 apartments set aside for affordable housing. The building is to have 17,000 sq ft of retail space split amongst four storefronts, as well as a 36,000 sq ft elementary school, which was to be sold to Jersey City for $1. Additionally, a public plaza on the corner of Columbus Drive and Warren Street.

In 2022, the building was completed.

In 2023, the owner of the property refinanced the building for $340 million.

== Amenities ==
All units within the building contain quartz-countertop kitchens with full-height backsplashes. They all include modular closets, in-unit washer and dryers, smart thermostats, and video intercom systems.

There is a large outdoor rooftop deck with various amenities on it. This includes fire pits, grilling stations, cabanas, foosball tables, billiard tables, and an outdoor amphitheater. The building contains a 60 by 35 foot pool, which includes a spa. There is also a pet spa and dog run.

Inside the building, there are various other amenities. The building contains a fitness center, spin and yoga studios, co-working area with conference rooms, and a terrace with private dining. Additionally, the building contains lots of creative and entertainment amenities, including a makerspace, chef's kitchen, karaoke lounge, bowling alley, game room, golf simulator, and children's playroom.

The building is smoke-free, and contains an app that shares data on the building's energy usage and carbon footprint.

Within the parking garage, there are electric vehicle charging stations on each floor, as well as 375 bicycle parking spaces.

The building also contains a 24-hour concierge and a WiFi enabled cafe.

Haus25 is located near two PATH stations, two Hudson-Bergen Light Rail stations, several NJTRANSIT bus stops, two Hudson-Bergen Light Rail stations, as well as two ferry stations serving the NY Waterway and Seastreak.

== See also ==
- List of tallest buildings in Jersey City
- List of tallest buildings in New Jersey
