= 420 Marin Boulevard =

Residential skyscraper in Jersey City, New Jersey

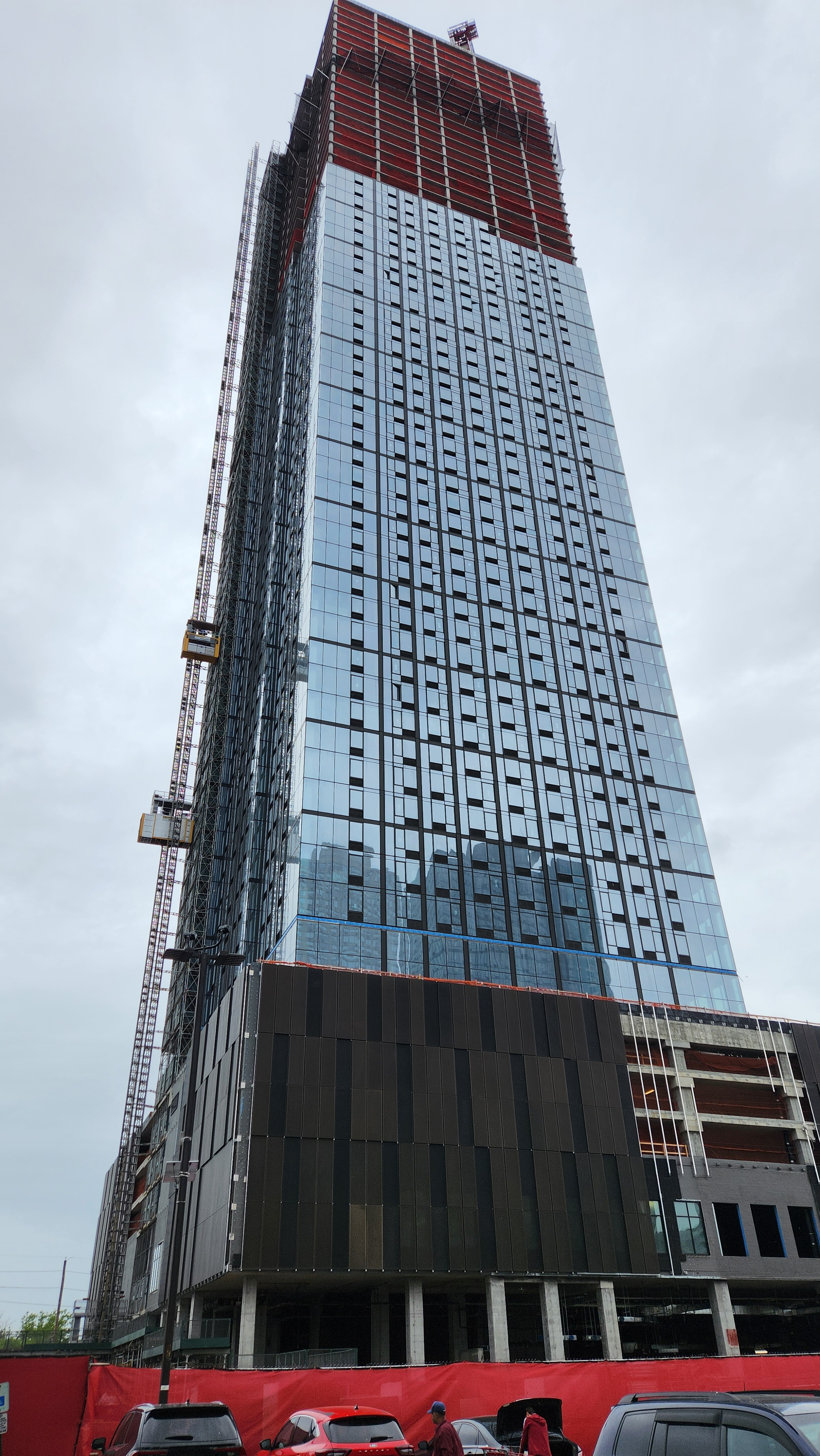
- 420 Marin Boulevard under construction in May 2025

General information
- Status: Topped-out
- Type: Residential/Mixed-use
- Location: Jersey City, New Jersey, US
- Coordinates: 40°43′27″N 74°02′23″W
- Construction started: 2023

Height
- Roof: 634 ft (193 m)

Technical details
- Floor count: 60
- Floor area: 1,300,000 sq ft (120,000 m^{2})

Design and construction
- Architect: Beyer Blinder Belle
- Developer: Brookfield Properties, G&S Investors
- Main contractor: Consigli Construction

420 Marin Boulevard is a 634 ft (193 m), 60-story residential skyscraper under construction in Jersey City, New Jersey. The building, designed by Beyer Blinder Belle and developed by Brookfield Properties and G&S Investors, will yield 802 rental apartments and 115,000 sq ft (10,700 m^{2}) of retail space once completed. The building is part of the Hudson Exchange master-planned development, which will also feature 20,000 sq ft (1,900 m^{2}) of publicly accessible green space. The building will also feature a parking garage at its base.

Brookfield and G&S secured a $420 million loan in 2023 to finance the project, which itself cost $620 million. Construction began the same year, and the building has been topped out as of 2025.

== See also ==
- List of tallest buildings in Jersey City
