= The James Monroe =

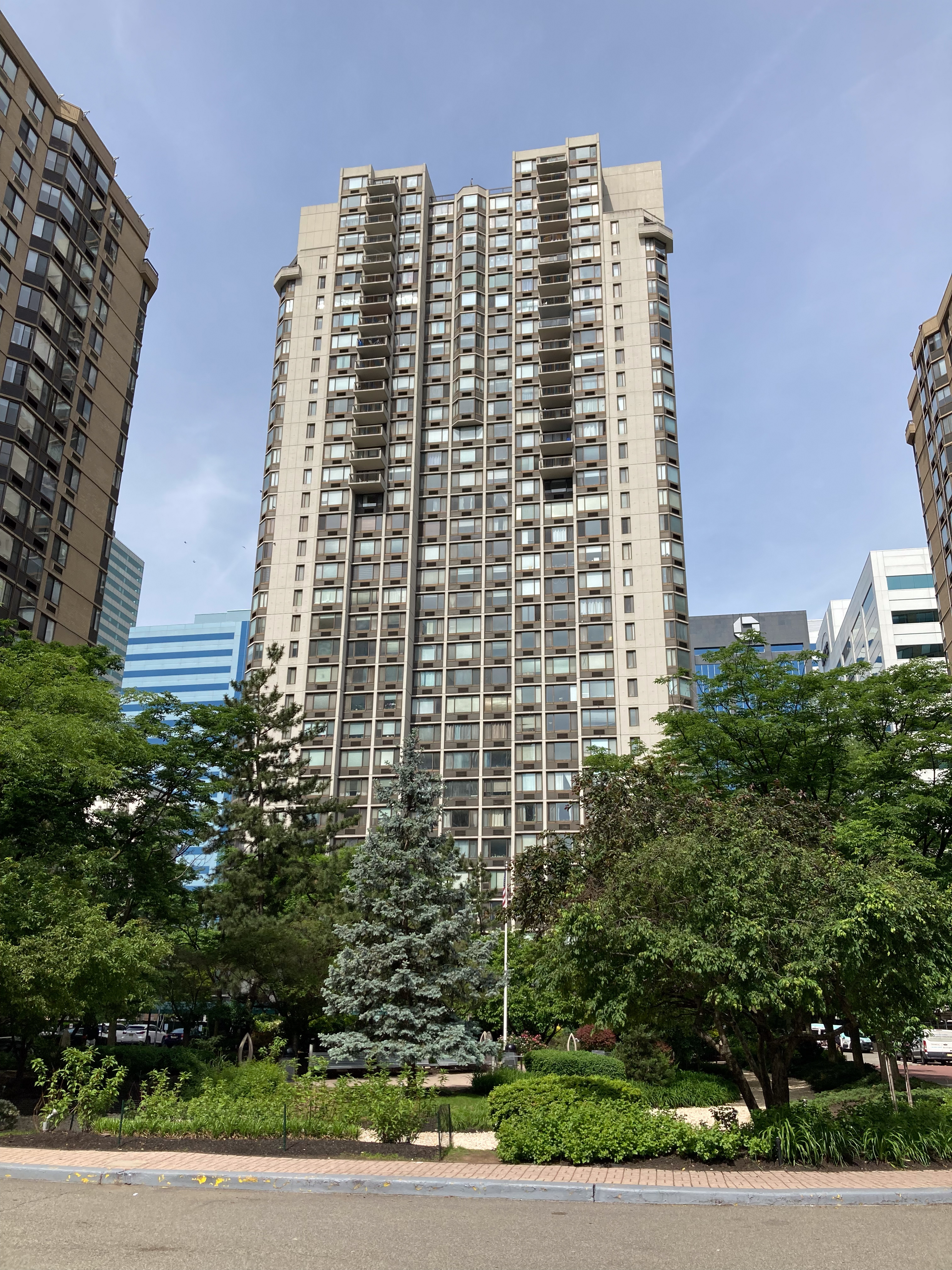
- A view of the James Monroe as seen from River Drive South, taken in 2025
- Interactive map of the The James Monroe area

General information
- Type: Residential
- Location: 45 River Drive South, Jersey City, New Jersey, 07310, United States
- Coordinates: 40.7283°N 74.0335°W
- Completed: 1989

Height
- Roof: 312 ft (95 m)

Technical details
- Floor count: 34
- Lifts/elevators: 4

Design and construction
- Developer: Lefrak *Queenstogether *Melvin Simon & Associates *Glimcher Company
- Main contractor: LeFrak

The James Monroe (named after James Monroe) is a 312-foot-tall (95-m) residential skyscraper in the Newport neighborhood of Jersey City, New Jersey. It was completed in 1989 and has 34 floors and stands at a height of 312 feet (95 meters). The 443-unit, 34-story residential condominium tower contains studio apartments, one and two bedroom units, and three bedroom duplexes. It was developed by the Lefrak Organization of Rego Park, Queens together with Melvin Simon & Associates of Indianapolis and the Glimcher Company of Columbus, Ohio.

== History ==
Developer Samuel J. LeFrak first inspected the building site, with views of the Manhattan skyline, rail connections, and proximity to the city, in 1983. Construction on the Monroe began in 1986 and the building was completed in 1989. The proximity to Manhattan attracted immediate attention from New Yorkers. It opened in 1989, just before a real estate recession hit that lasted until 1995. The company missed and had to renegotiate a mortgage payment in 1991.

The James Monroe was built relatively early in the transformation of the largely abandoned, post-industrial waterfront of "old factories and rotting rail yards" that made up the Jersey City waterfront in the 1980s and 90s into an upscale, residential neighborhood. The building is part of a larger building boom in Jersey City's decayed railroad and warehouse waterfront district which is being redeveloped with large towers such as the James Monroe. It has since attracted international buyers.

== See also ==
- List of tallest buildings in Jersey City
