= 505 Summit =

Residential skyscraper in Jersey City, New Jersey

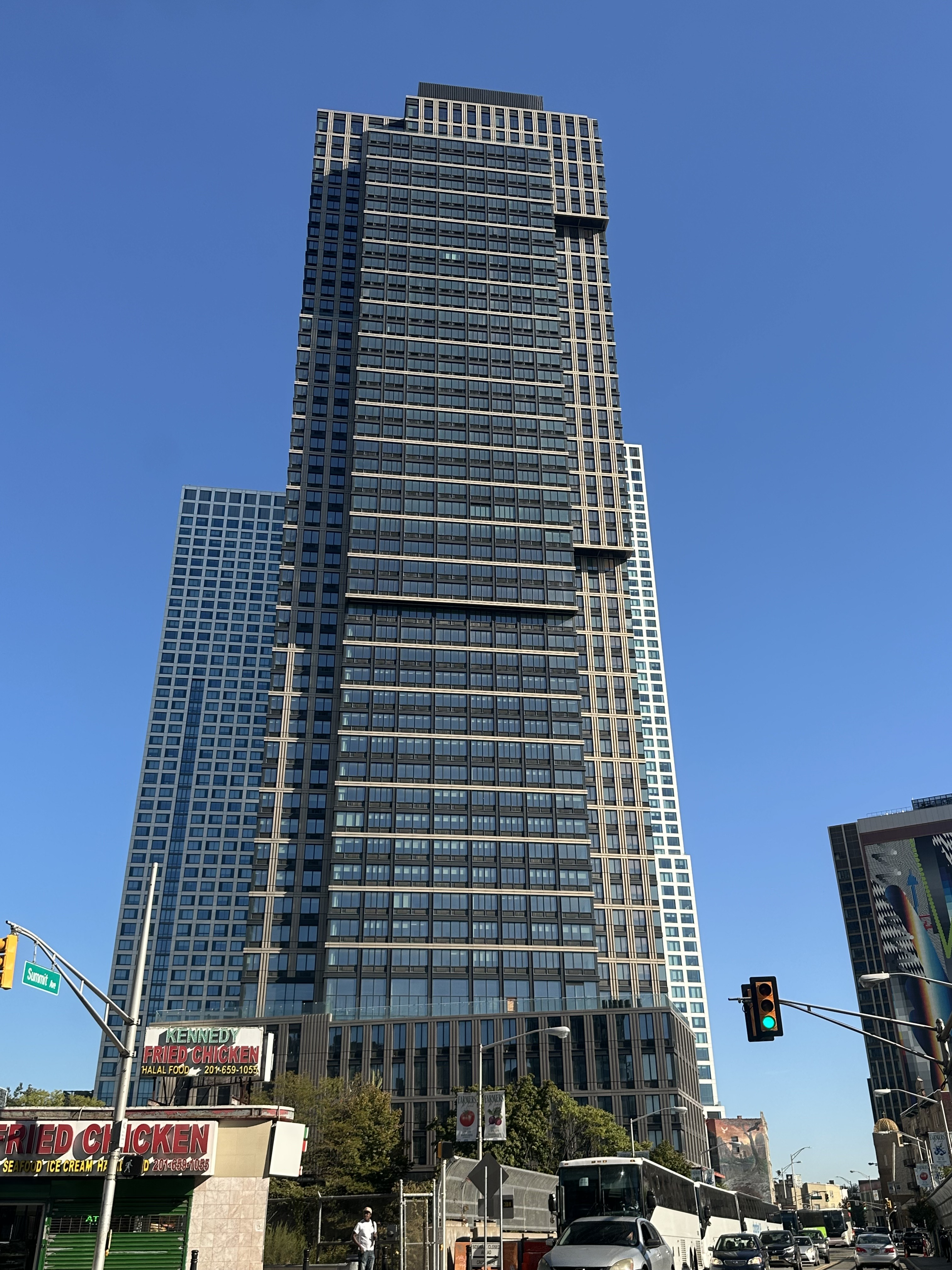
- Interactive map of the 505 Summit area

General information
- Status: Topped-out
- Type: Residential
- Location: Jersey City, New Jersey, U.S.
- Coordinates: 40.7314°N 74.0609°W
- Construction started: 2023

Height
- Roof: 577 feet (176 m)

Technical details
- Floor count: 54

Design and construction
- Architect: HLW International
- Developer: Panepinto Properties

505 Summit is a 577 ft (176 m), 54-story residential skyscraper under construction in the Journal Square neighborhood of Jersey City, New Jersey. Designed by HLW International and developed by Panepinto Properties, the building will yield 605 rental units and 4,000 sq ft (370 m^{2}) of retail space. The building features a cast-in-place concrete structure and a glazed aluminum curtain wall facade with brown and black paneling. A 3,200 sq ft (300 m^{2}) plaza will also be constructed adjacent to the tower.

The $388 million project was first approved in early 2022. It secured $193 million in financing in August 2023 before beginning construction in September under the name Pathside Tower. The building topped out in May 2025.
