= Journal Squared =

Skyscraper in Jersey City, New Jersey

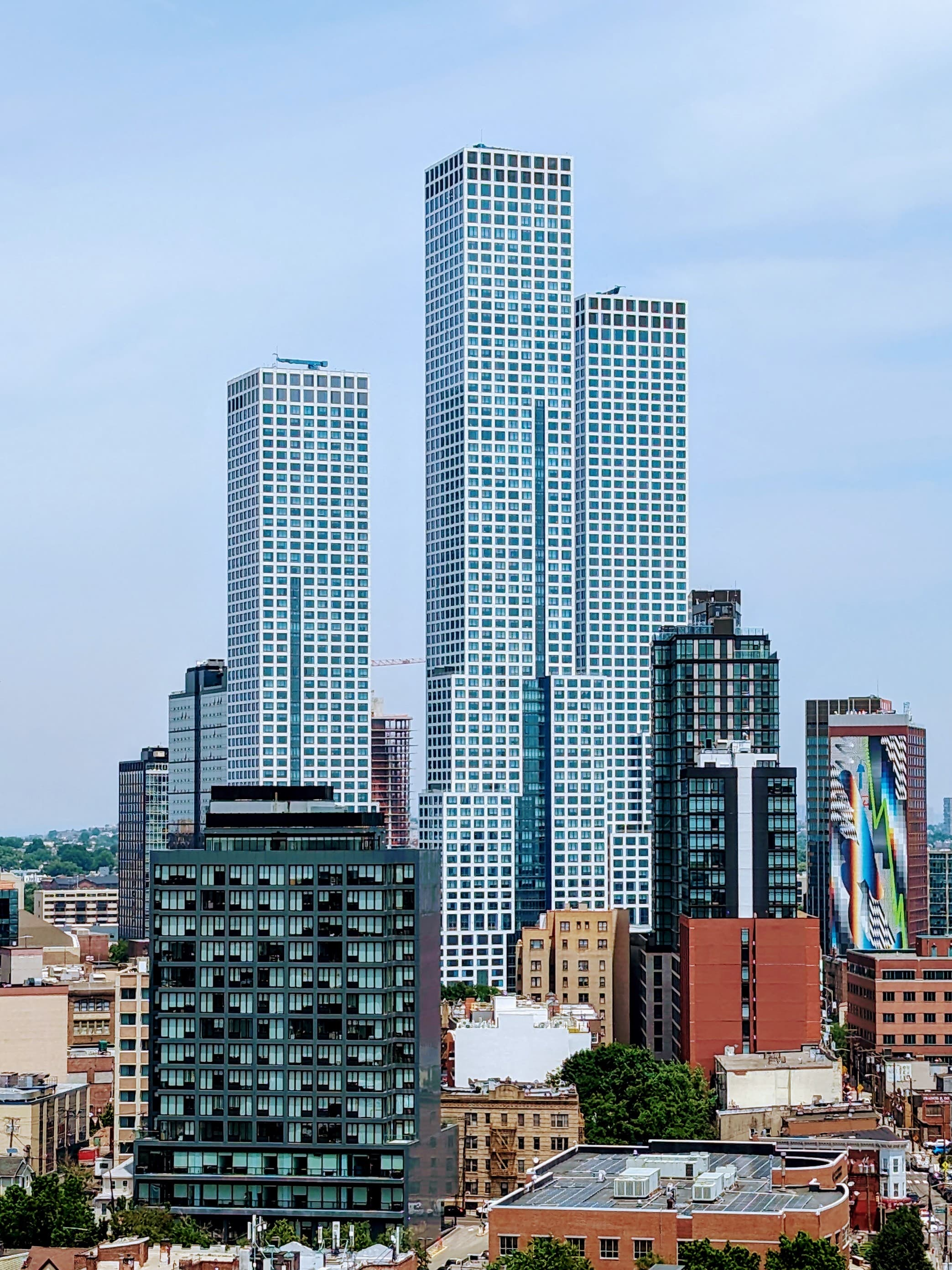
- Interactive map of the Journal Squared area

General information
- Type: Residential highrises
- Location: 615 Pavonia Avenue; Journal Square; Jersey City, New Jersey
- Coordinates: 40.732141°N 74.063114°W
- Construction started: 21 October 2014
- Completed: July 2024

Height
- Roof: 229.8 m (754 ft) 193 m (633 ft) 175 m (574 ft)

Technical details
- Floor count: 54, 68, and 60

Design and construction
- Architects: Handel Architects; Hollwich Kushner
- Developer: Kushner Real Estate Group

Website
- www.journalsquared.com

Journal Squared, or J2, is a three-tower retail and residential complex at Journal Square in Jersey City, New Jersey.

== Site ==
The site of the project is adjacent to the Journal Square Transportation Center on Summit Avenue across from the Hudson County Administration Building, the county seat of Hudson County and the Newkirk House, the oldest extant building in the county.

== Funding and abatements ==
Journal Squared was developed by Kushner Real Estate Group. It was first approved by the city council in December 2012 and was later granted a 30-year tax abatement and $10 million in bonds.

== Design ==
The project was designed by Handel Architects and Hollwich Kushner. The project consists of three towers, in which 2,000 new office, residential, and retail units would be built, with the residential spaces making up the majority of the complex. It also includes a large plaza that occupies a portion of the lot, which can be used for public gatherings and functions as an open space in the complex.

== Construction ==
The project broke ground in October 2014 with the first building topping out in December 2015 at 54 stories and 574 ft (175 m). Construction began on the second and tallest of the three towers in 2018. Elicc Americas Corp. was the facade manufacturer and installer The second tower topped out in December 2019. The third tower, consisting of 600 units and rising 60 stories, broke ground in October 2021. The buildout of all three phases were completed in July 2024. With this, the towers joined among the tallest buildings in the city. In November 2024, there was a ribbon-cutting ceremony for the third tower.

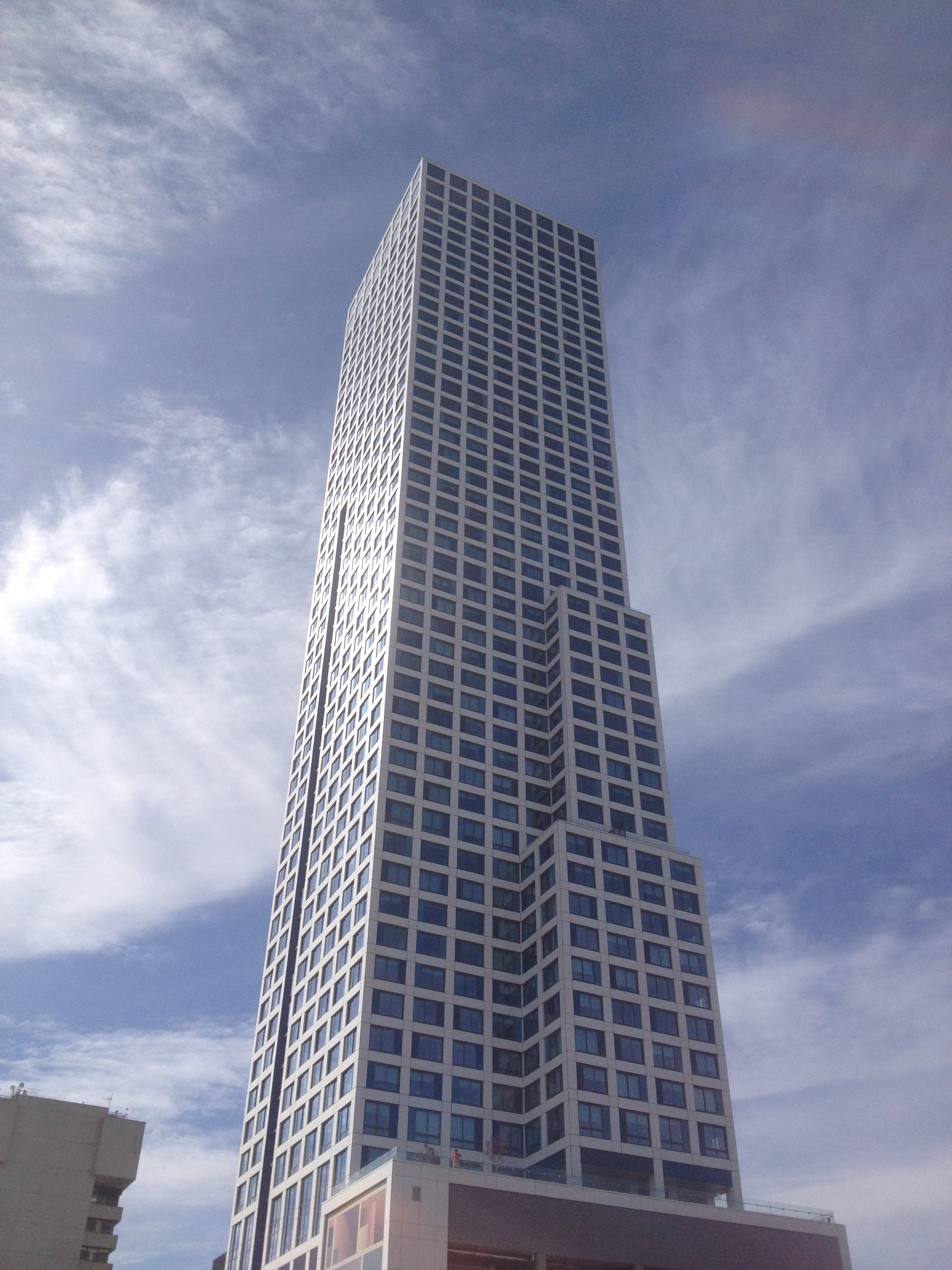
The first tower of the complex after completion

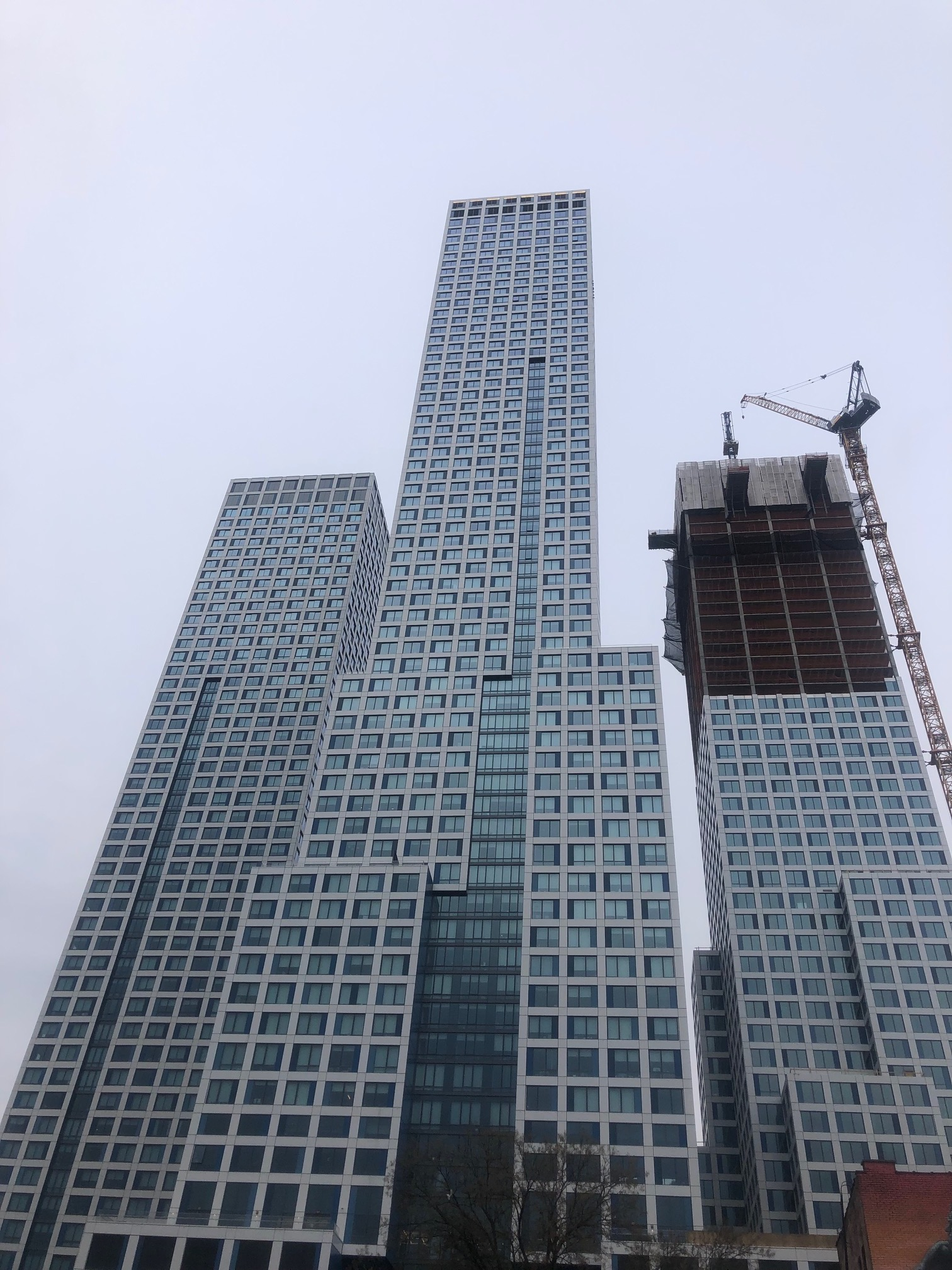
Construction progress in February 2023

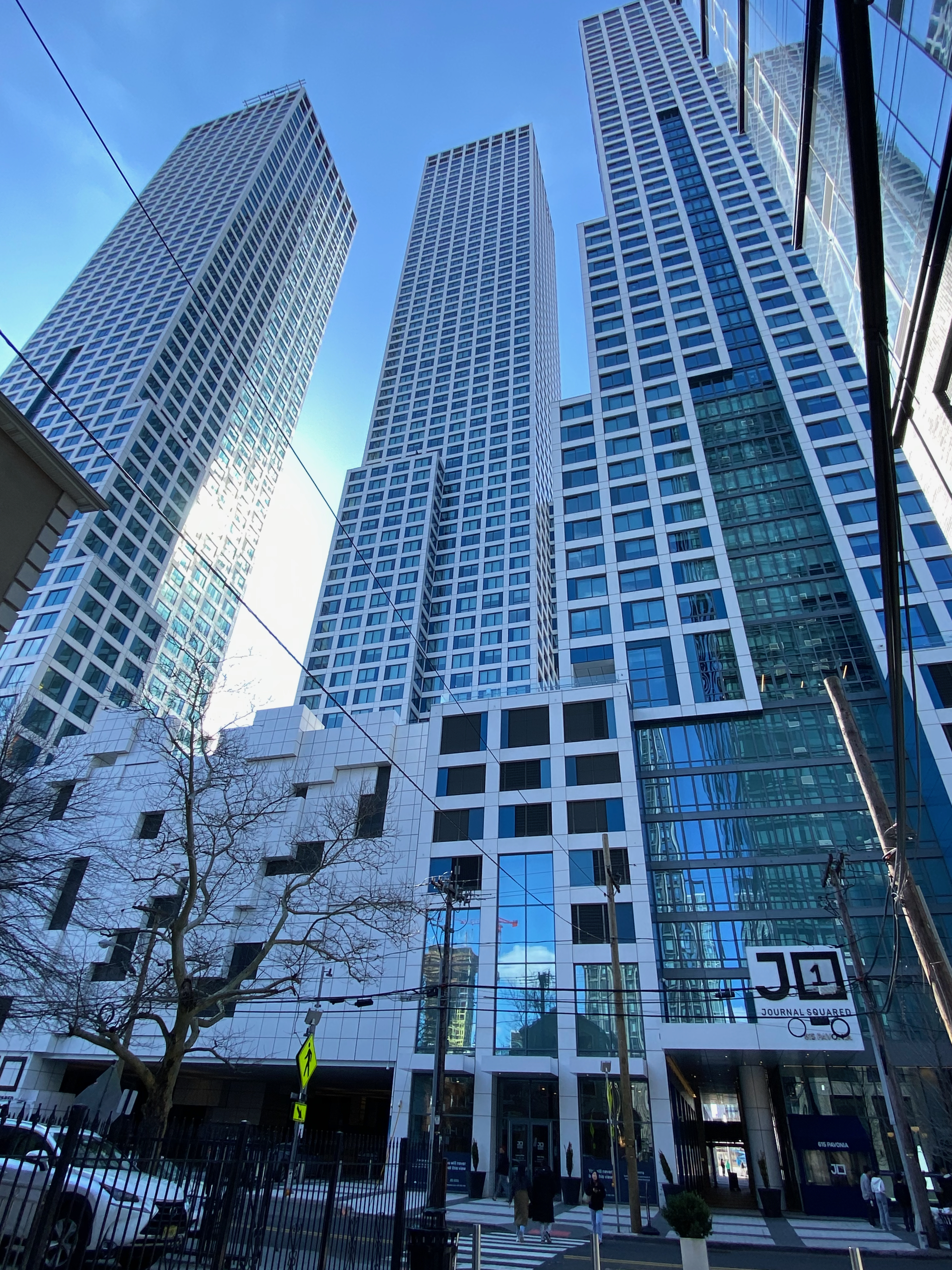
The complex: Tower Three (left), Tower Two (middle), Tower One (right)

== See also ==
- Hilltop, Jersey City
- List of tallest buildings in Jersey City
- 1 Journal Square
