= Newport Tower (Jersey City) =

Skyscraper in New Jersey, US

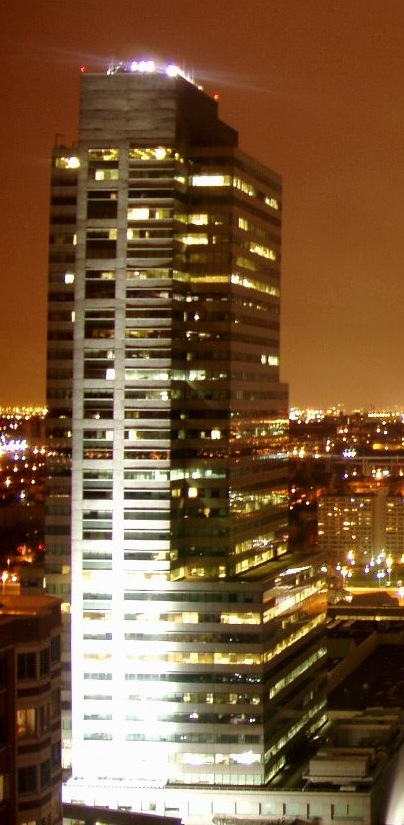
- The Newport Tower.
- Interactive map of the Newport Tower area

Record height
- Tallest in New Jersey from 1991 to 1992^{[I]}
- Preceded by: Exchange Place Center
- Surpassed by: 101 Hudson Street

General information
- Status: Completed
- Coordinates: 40.72778°N 74.0351°W
- Opening: 1991
- Owner: Multi-Employer Property Trust

Height
- Height: 531 ft (162m)

Technical details
- Floor count: 37
- Floor area: 98,566 m^{2} (1,060,960 sq ft)
- Lifts/elevators: 22

Design and construction
- Structural engineer: Cantor Seinuk Group
- Main contractor: Huber Hunt & Nichols

The Newport Tower (also known as 525 Washington Boulevard) is an office building in the Newport area of Jersey City, New Jersey. It was briefly the tallest building in New Jersey upon its completion. It has 37 floors, is 531 ft (162 m) tall, and is connected to the Newport Centre Mall. The mall is one of the few enclosed, regional shopping facilities in Hudson County. The building was developed by Melvin Simon & Associates in 1990. The Newport Tower is next to the Hudson River and is almost exactly across the river from the World Financial Center in Manhattan.

The tower received a facelift in the summer of 2005; wooden panels were installed on the lobby walls, and LCD advertisement screens added to the elevators. The colonnade in front of the building was removed in July 2008. A new elevator management system, Schindler ID, was installed in the building in September 2009.

On October 19, 2011, Multi-Employer Property Trust purchased the Newport Tower from Brookfield Properties for $377.5 million. Brookfield Properties took ownership of the Newport Tower in June 2006 after the $4.8 billion acquisition of Trizec Properties.

== See also ==
- List of tallest buildings in Jersey City
