= Liberty Towers (Jersey City) =

Apartment complex in Jersey City, New Jersey, US

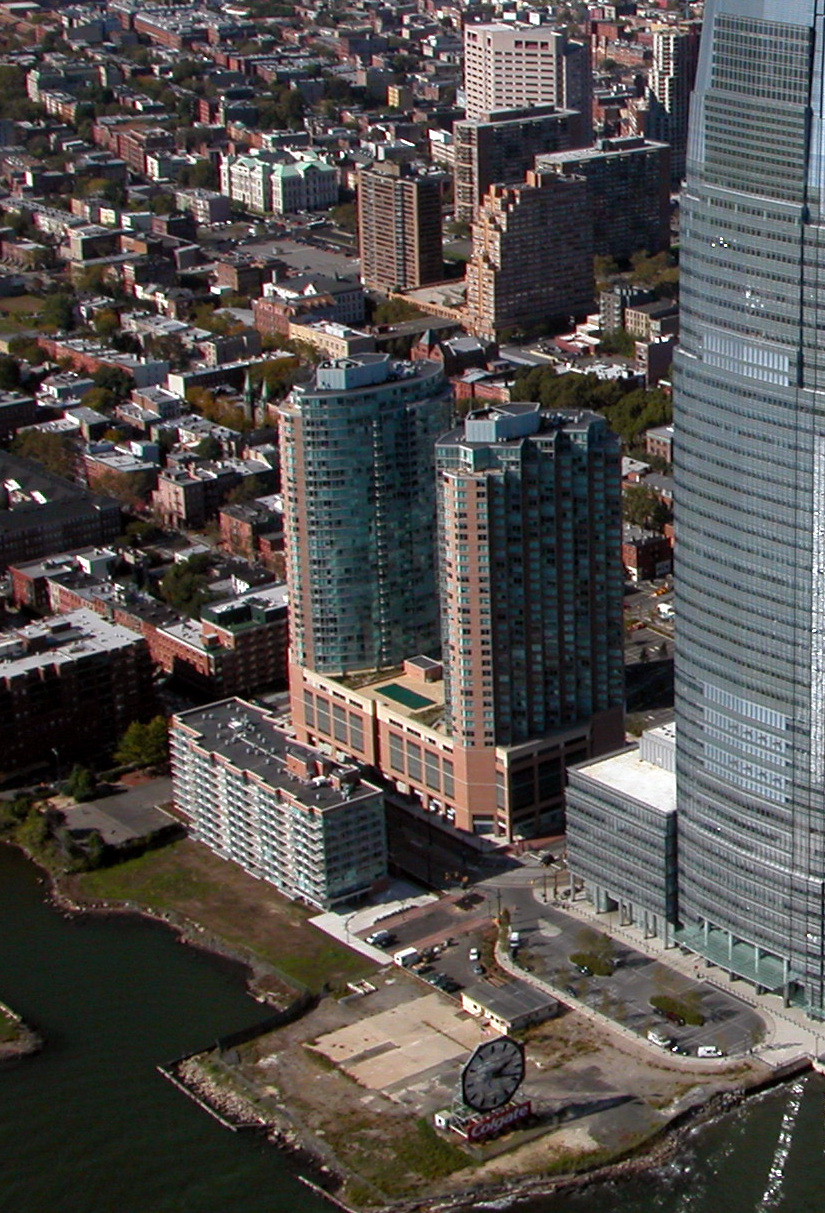
- Liberty Towers
- Interactive map of the Liberty Towers area

General information
- Type: Residential
- Location: 29 Hudson Street at Essex; Jersey City, New Jersey
- Coordinates: 40.7132°N 74.0357°W
- Construction started: 2001
- Completed: 2003

Height
- Architectural: 380 ft (120 m)
- Roof: 380 ft (120 m)

Technical details
- Floor count: 36

Design and construction
- Architect: Jordan Gruzen of Gruzen Samton
- Main contractor: Turner Construction

Website
- https://www.libertytowersapts.com/

The Liberty Towers or Liberty View Towers, is an apartment complex in Jersey City, New Jersey. It consists of Liberty Towers West, and Liberty Towers East, both of which were constructed from 2001 to 2003 and have 36 floors. They also have the same height of 380 ft (120 m). The buildings rise from the same podium (base), which is used for parking and also contains a lobby. On top of the podium is a deck with leisure facilities for the tenants. The complex has 648 residential units. They were designed by architect Jordan Gruzen.

The S. A. Wald Company Building was demolished to make way for Liberty Towers, which were originally called "Liberty View Towers". The postmodern buildings are made out of masonry, glass, and concrete.

The building was part of a building boom in Jersey City's decayed railroad, warehouse and waterfront district, which was being redeveloped as large towers complex in the mid 2010s. It is in the middle of the reconstructed downtown and has access to trains.

== See also ==
- List of tallest buildings in Jersey City
