= The Journal (building) =

Skyscraper in Jersey City, New Jersey

- Former names: One Journal Square

General information
- Status: Tower I: Topped-Out; Tower II: Under construction
- Type: Residential
- Location: Journal Square, Jersey City, New Jersey
- Coordinates: 40.7311°N 74.0635°W

Height
- Height: 710 feet (220 m)

Technical details
- Floor count: 64 (52 in each tower, 12 in base)

Design and construction
- Architecture firm: Woods Bagot
- Developer: Kushner Companies
- Structural engineer: Langan Engineering
- Main contractor: AJD Construction

Other information
- Number of units: 1,723

The Journal is a skyscraper complex in Journal Square in Jersey City, New Jersey. It is the fourth tallest building by structural height in Jersey City.. The complex includes twin 52-story high-rises over a 12-story base rising 710 feet (220 m). Upon completion, it became the second-tallest twin towers in the United States.

Initially named One Journal Square, artist renditions of the $1 billion project were released in 2021. Construction began 2022 after significant delays. Tower One opened in 2024, and that November, the project was renamed The Journal. Tower Two opened in 2025, and the entire project was complete by January 2026.

== History ==
The land of the project had been vacant since 2009, and was bought in 2014. A previously approved design by Becker + Becker Associates was being developed by Harwood Properties. Construction was never started on the project and Harwood eventually sold the property to Kushner Companies in January 2015 for $27 million.

An initial design consisted of two towers, called One Journal Square, with roughly 3,000 residential units and 160,000 square feet of commercial space, but the project was scaled back in 2020. Construction began in 2022. The first tower was topped off in 2024.

In July 2024, Kushner Companies secured a $295 million loan from Apollo and RXR Realty, helping secure the funding for the remainder of the project. The entire project is expected to be completed in 2026.

Tower One opened in 2024. That November, the building project was renamed from One Journal Square to The Journal.

Pre-leasing for The Journal began in January 2025. In October 2025, the building began leasing. Tower Two opened that year. The entire project was complete by January 2026.

== Design ==
The complex consists of twin 52-story towers over a 12-story base rising 710 feet to be built in two phases. The entire project includes 1,723 residential units (consisting of studios, one-bedrooms, two-bedrooms, and three-bedrooms), 41,000-square feet of retail space, and a 883-space parking garage. Reconstruction of the public plaza outside the Journal Square Transportation Center includes turning the taxi stand to green space.

The complex offers many amenities for residents, including an Olympic-size indoor pool, cold plunge pool, whirlpool spa, sauna and steam rooms, a bowling alley, golf simulators, multiple lounges, co-working spaces, a chef’s kitchen and a kid’s club. There are two landscaped rooftop terraces with a swimming pool and hot tub. Fitness amenities include a full size basketball court, a rock climbing wall, a squash court, a spin cycle room, and several training rooms. The anchor tenant for the retail portion of the building is Target. The 40,000 square foot store opened March 29, 2026.

== Legal issues ==
In August 2019, Kushner Companies lost a lawsuit in which they claimed they were unfairly denied tax abatements due the project. The company and Jersey City later entered into a settlement agreement where Kushner agreed to make a $2.5 million investment in local arts initiatives in exchange for the project's approval.

In May 2025, the New Jersey Department of Labor and Workforce Development issued three stop work orders against multiple contractors who were flagged for issues including worker misclassification, unpaid or late wages, overtime rate violations, and not providing proper earned sick leave for workers.

== See also ==
- List of tallest buildings in Jersey City
- Journal Squared
- Journal Square
