= Hudson Greene =

Skyscraper in Jersey City, New Jersey

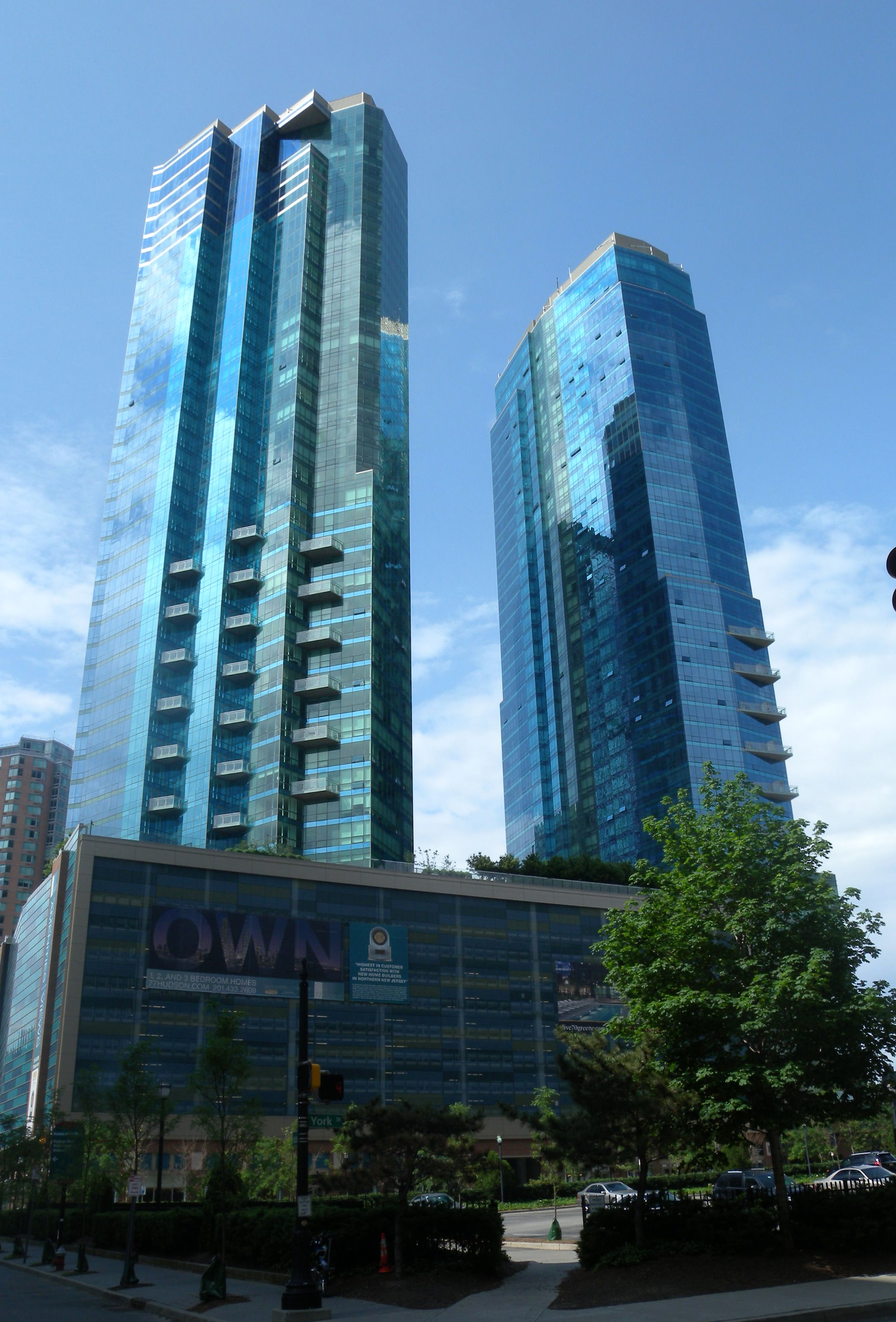
- 77 Hudson Street (left) and 70 Greene Street (right) (2011)
- Interactive map of the Hudson Greene area

General information
- Status: Completed
- Type: 77 Hudson: residential condominiums 70 Greene: rental apartments
- Location: 77 Hudson Street, and 70 Greene Street; Jersey City, New Jersey
- Coordinates: 40.71450°N 74.0353°W
- Construction started: 2006
- Completed: 77 Hudson: 2009; 70 Greene: 2010
- Operator: 77 Hudson: K. Hovnanian Homes; 70 Greene: Equity Residential

Height
- Roof: 500 ft (152 m)

Technical details
- Floor count: 48
- Floor area: 77 Hudson: 551,500 sq ft (51,240 m^{2}), 70 Greene: 491,017 sq ft (45,617.0 m^{2})
- Lifts/elevators: 6 in each tower

Design and construction
- Architects: Cetra/Ruddy, Inc.

Hudson Greene is an apartment complex in Jersey City, New Jersey which consists two towers, the East Tower at 77 Hudson Street, which are condominiums, and the West Tower at 70 Greene Street, which are rental apartments. Both have 48 floors and are 500 ft (152m) tall. They are tied with each other for 16th tallest building in Jersey City. Construction on the towers began on June 25, 2006, and was completed in 2009 (77 Hudson) and 2010 (70 Greene). The East Tower at 77 Hudson Street has 420 residences and 19,000 square feet (1,800 m^{2}) of street-level retail space. The building was designed by the architectural firm CetraRuddy.

Building construction was beset with several problems. A fire on the West Tower in October 2007 delayed construction. Fighting the fire proved difficult due to the stage of construction and status of floors and standpipes. Five months later, in March 2008, a construction worker fell 14 floors to his death.

The building is part of a larger building boom in Jersey City's decayed railroad, warehouse and waterfront district which is being rebuilt as large towers like this. It has been described as "one of the most handsome in Jersey City thanks to its blue glass facades, gentle angles and balcony projections on its lower sections." It won several awards including:

- 2009 NJ Golden Trowel Awards – Masonry Award
- 2009 NY Residential Magazine – Top NJ Project
- 2011 Council on Tall Buildings and Urban Habitat (CTBUH) Best Tall Buildings – Honorable Mention

== See also ==
- List of tallest buildings in Jersey City
