= Marc Kushner =

American architect

- Born: September 27, 1977 (age 49); United States
- Education: University of Pennsylvania; Harvard University
- Occupations: Architect, entrepreneur, author
- Spouse: Christopher Barley
- Parent(s): Murray Kushner; Lee Kushner
- Family: Kushner

Marc Charles Kushner (born September 27, 1977) is an American architect, entrepreneur and author. He was a partner at the New York City based architecture firm Hollwich Kushner and co-founded Architizer.

== Early life and education ==
The son of Lee Kushner and step-son of real estate developer Murray Kushner, Marc Kushner was raised Modern Orthodox Jewish in Livingston, New Jersey. Kushner graduated from The Frisch School before attending the University of Pennsylvania where he received a Bachelor of Arts, majoring in Political Science and Contemporary Vernacular Architecture as Cultural Artifact. Kushner then attended Harvard Graduate School of Design and received a Master of Architecture.

== Business career ==
=== Architecture ===
After working for multiple architecture firms including Steven Holl, Jürgen Mayer H. and Lewis Tsurumaki Lewis, Kushner formed the architecture firm Hollwich Kushner in 2007 with Matthias Hollwich whom he had met in Jürgen Mayer's Berlin kitchen five years prior. In 2012 Marc Kushner and Matthias Hollwich won MoMA PS1's Young Architects Program with their project Wendy. Following the success of Wendy, Hollwich and Kushner received multiple commissions including the Fire Island Pines Pavilion (2013), the University of Pennsylvania’s LEED Gold Pennovation Center (2016), Journal Squared (2017), and the speculative innovation campus 25 Kent (2018). In 2017, the firm was included in Fast Company's ranking of the World's Most Innovative companies. Marc has spoken on the state of architecture at events such as TED and PSFK. In 2019 Marc Kushner left Hollwich Kushner.

=== Architizer ===
During the 2008 financial crisis, Marc Kushner and his business partner Matthias Hollwich created a digital platform to help architects promote their firms’ work. Architizer rapidly grew to become the largest platform for architecture online. To increase visibility of global architecture Kushner incepted the A+ Awards in 2013. They have grown to become the largest global architecture awards program.

=== The Future of Architecture in 100 Buildings ===
In 2014 Kushner was invited to speak at the 30th anniversary of TED in Vancouver. There he reviewed the last 30 years of architectural history and expounded on how social media was changing the direction of the way buildings are designed. The TED talk was followed in 2015 with Marc Kushner's first book, published by Simon & Schuster and TED Books - The Future of Architecture in 100 Buildings.

== Personal life ==
Kushner married Christopher Barley, also an architect, in a Jewish ceremony on March 31, 2012. He is openly gay.

Kushner's step-brother is Jon Kushner, a real estate developer and president of their family's real estate organization, Kushner Real Estate Group. Marc is a first cousin of former presidential advisor Jared Kushner (son-in-law of Donald Trump), and Joshua Kushner, managing partner of Thrive Capital, a New York-based private equity firm.

Kushner also serves as president of the Board of Friends of Plus Pool, a nonprofit behind the development of a water-filtering, floating swimming pool that will filter and clean urban rivers.

== See also ==
- Kushner family
