= Downtown Jersey City =

Populated place in Hudson County, New Jersey, US

Coordinates: 40.7281°N 74.0776°W

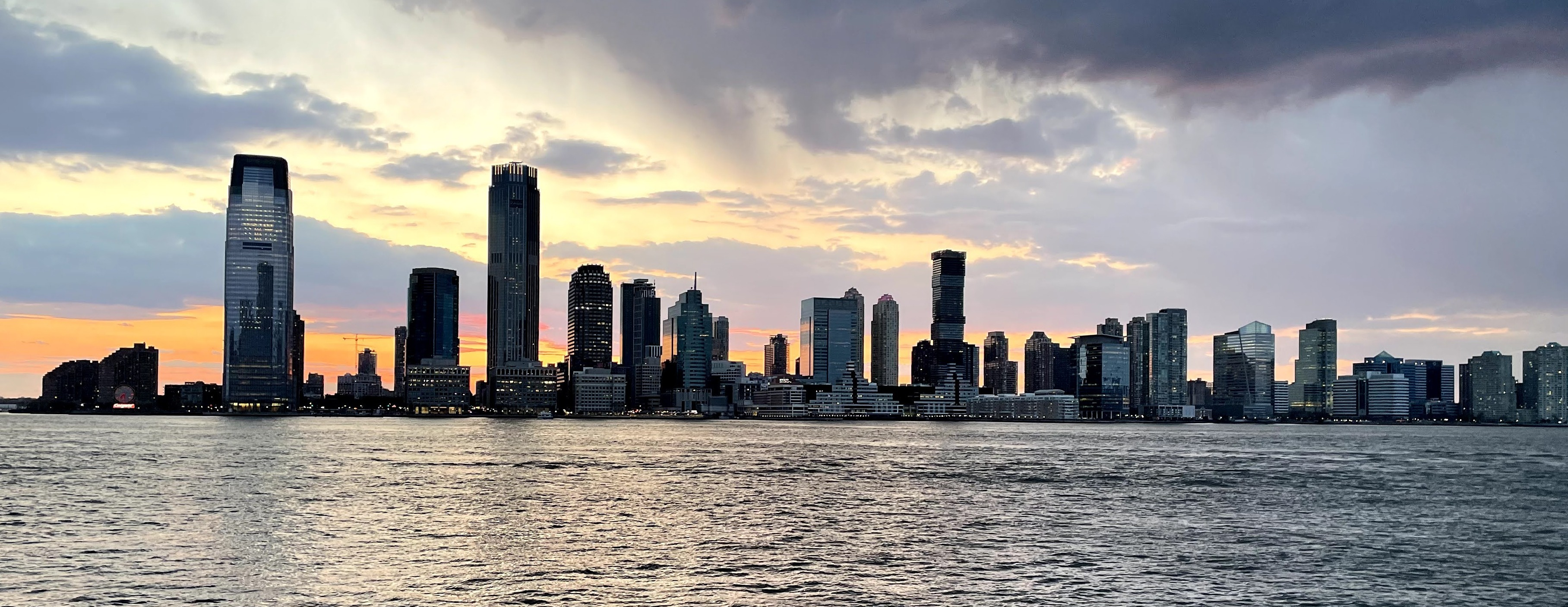
View of the waterfront of Downtown Jersey City, dubbed Wall Street West, at sunset

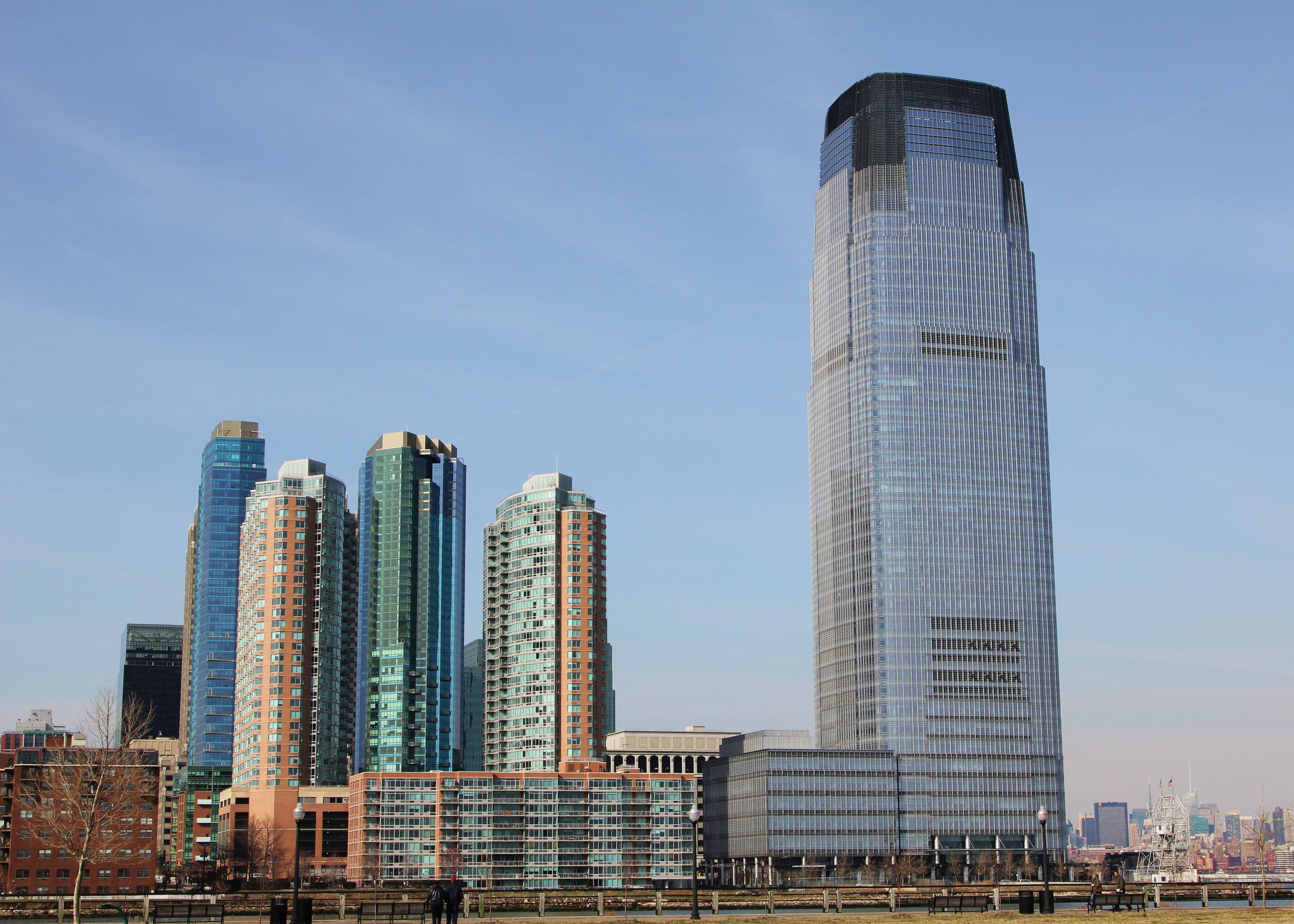
View of Downtown Jersey City from Liberty State Park

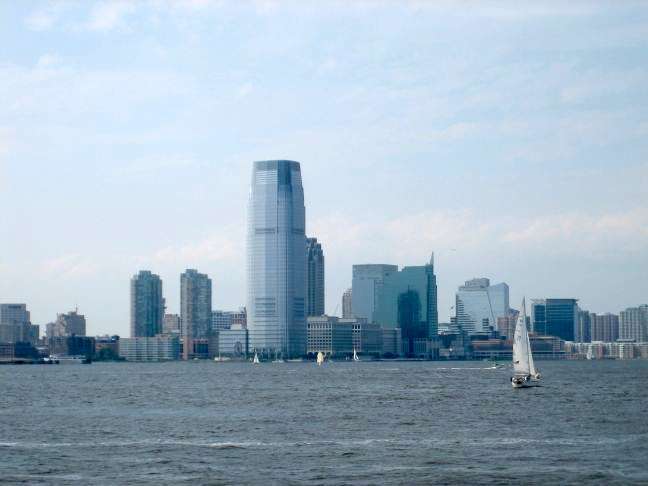
View of Downtown focused around the Goldman Sachs Tower

Downtown is an area of Jersey City, New Jersey, which includes the Historic Downtown and the Waterfront.

== Historic Downtown ==
Historic Downtown was an area of mostly low-rise buildings to the west of the waterfront, but by the 2000s a number of high-rise buildings had been constructed. The area includes the neighborhoods of Van Vorst Park and Hamilton Park, which are square parks surrounded by brownstones. The Grove Street neighborhood has also seen considerable development and the neighborhood is rich with stores and restaurants.

== Waterfront ==
Redevelopment of the Jersey City waterfront has made the city one of the largest centers of banking and finance in the United States and has led to the district and city being nicknamed Wall Street West. By the early 2020s, the construction of numerous residential skyscrapers along the waterfront made median rental rates in Jersey City the highest of any city in the United States.

WALDO (Work And Live District Overlay) is an area that is being redeveloped from its days as a warehouse center into an artist community. It is already home to several galleries and restaurants, and the development of artist housing, more galleries, a museum, and stores is being planned. The former Hudson and Manhattan Railroad Powerhouse is the building that anchors this neighborhood and when it is renovated it will maintain its shell that so many locals are used to seeing. A Trump Plaza is currently being constructed on the property to the south of the Powerhouse. In January 2016, the Federal Aviation Administration gave navigational clearance for the construction of a 900-foot (270 m) residential and commercial tower planned by the Chinese Overseas America Corporation. The building, 99 Hudson Street, was completed in 2020 and succeeded the Goldman Sachs Tower as the tallest building in New Jersey.

== See also ==
- List of tallest buildings in Jersey City
