= List of tallest buildings in Jersey City =

Skyline of Jersey City
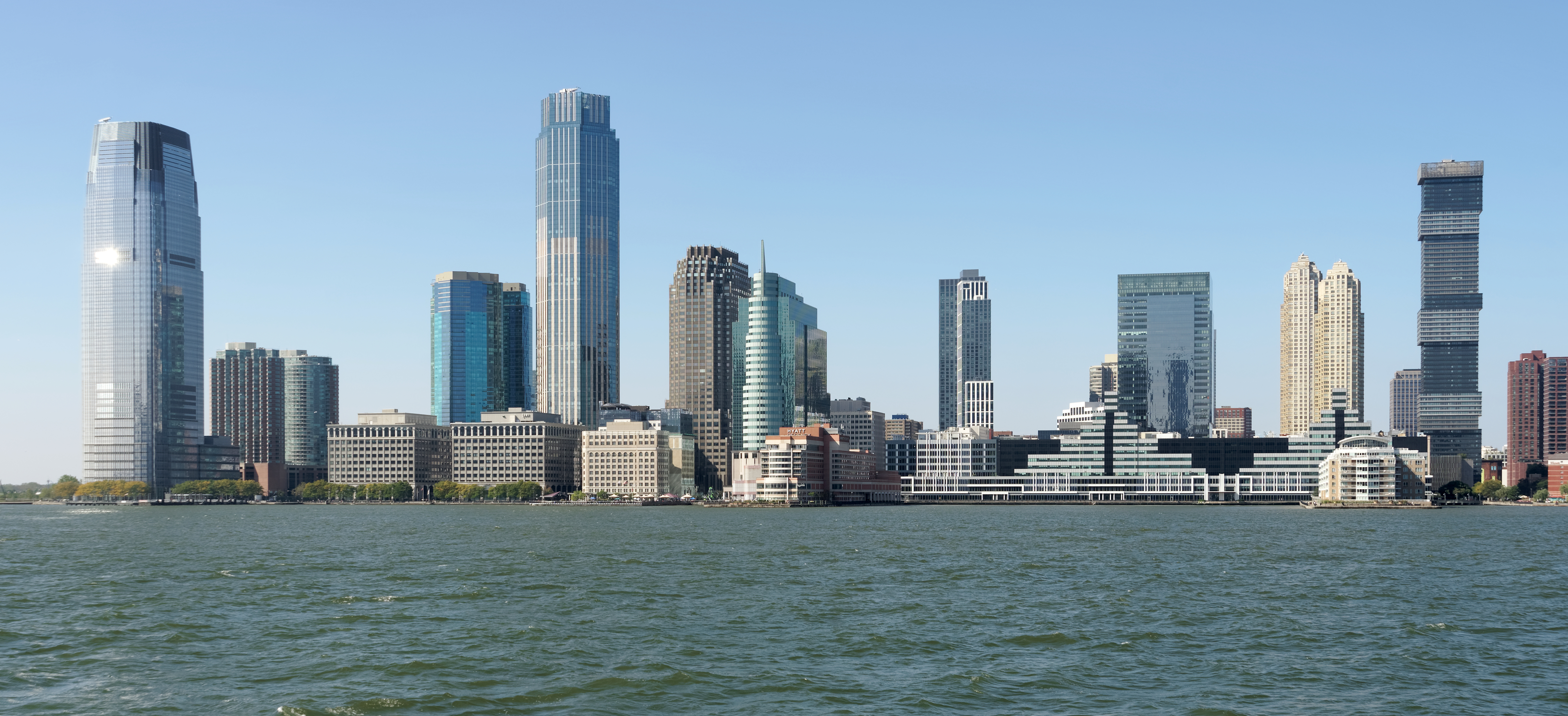
- Downtown Skyline in October 2023 (Click or hover over image to identify buildings) Exchange Place in 2023 (Use cursor to identify buildings)
- Tallest building: 99 Hudson Street (2020)
- Tallest building height: 889 ft (271 m)
- Major clusters: Downtown Jersey City; Journal Square
- First 150 m+ building: Newport Tower (1990)

Number of tall buildings (2026)
- Taller than 100 m (328 ft): 51 + 1 T/O (Note: Topped-out)
- Taller than 150 m (492 ft): 22 + 1 T/O
- Taller than 200 m (656 ft): 6

Number of tall buildings — feet
- Taller than 300 ft (91.4 m): 62 + 1 T/O

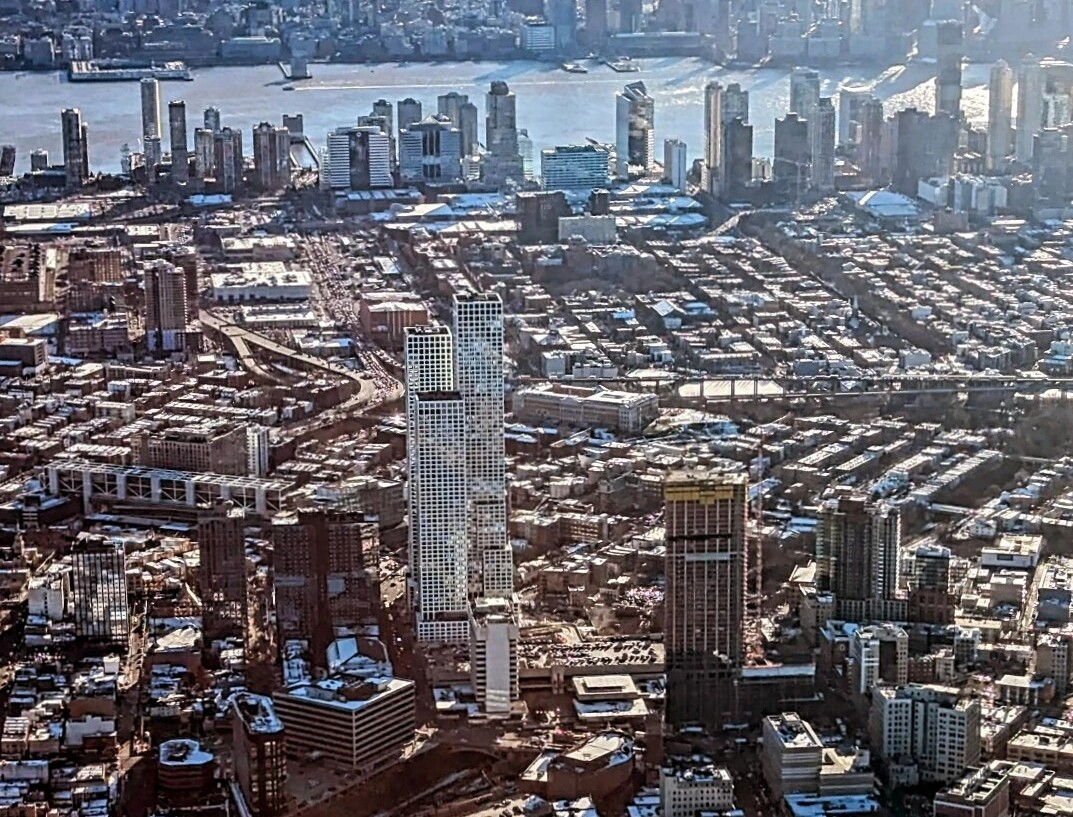
The skyline of Journal Square in 2024, with the skyscrapers of Downtown in the background

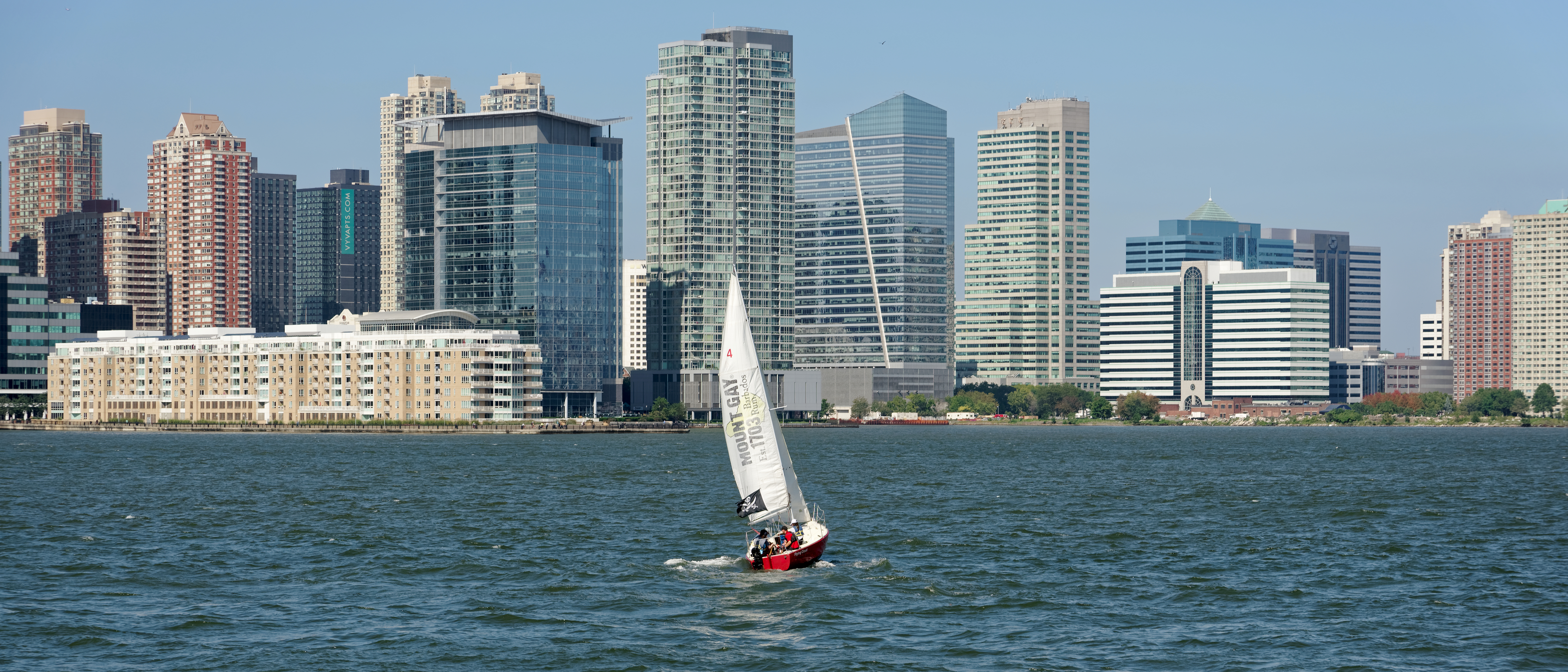
High-rises in Jersey City along the Hudson River

Jersey City is the second-largest city in the U.S state of New Jersey, and the third most populous city in the New York metropolitan area. As of 2026, there are over 120 completed high-rises in the city. 60 of them are taller than 300 feet (91 meters), 22 of which are over 492 feet (150 m) in height. The tallest building in the city is the 76-story 99 Hudson Street at 889 feet (271 m), a residential tower completed in 2020. It is the tallest building in New Jersey. Jersey City has the most high-rises in the New York metropolitan area outside of New York City itself, and the most skyscrapers of any American city that is not the largest city in its metropolitan area. Jersey City's skyline is one of the largest in the Northeastern United States. It is the city with the third-most skyscrapers taller than 492 ft (150 m) in the region, after New York City and Boston, and ahead of Philadelphia.

The history of skyscrapers in Jersey City began with the 1928 completion of the 15-story Labor Bank Building, regarded as the first skyscraper in the city. Now known as 26 Journal Square, it was added to the National Register of Historic Places in 1984. Despite being adjacent to Lower Manhattan, Jersey City saw little high-rise development until the 1980s. For most of the remaining 20th century, the tallest buildings in the city were part of The Beacon, a medical development operated by the Jersey City Medical Center. Deindustrialization and depopulation led to a period of urban decline during the mid-20th century. Beginning in the mid-1980s, the formerly industrial waterfront was redeveloped into numerous high-rise buildings such as Newport Tower and 101 Hudson Street, as the city underwent an economic renaissance.

Jersey City went through a larger period of commercial and residential high-rise development beginning from the late 1990s, which has continued to the present. This boom has resulted in the construction of many of the city's tallest buildings, such as 30 Hudson Street, an office skyscraper standing 781 ft (238 m) tall. Completed in 2004, it is currently the city's second tallest building. However, most new high-rises have been residential. Jersey City's skyscraper boom is a part of a larger city-wide apartment boom, which has been attributed towards its accessibility to Manhattan. The city had one of the fastest-growing skylines in the United States during the early 21st century, with the number of buildings taller than 300 ft (91 m) rising from 10 in 2000 to 60 by 2025.

Most of Jersey City's skyscrapers are located in along the city's waterfront on the Hudson River, which separates the city from Lower Manhattan and its skyscrapers to the west. This area of Downtown Jersey City, known as Exchange Place, is nicknamed "Wall Street West" due to its concentration of financial companies. Since the early 2020s, a second major cluster of skyscrapers has formed in the district of Journal Square, which is further inland. Beginning with the three-tower Journal Squared complex, Journal Square is undergoing substantial urban development alongside improved transit links. To a lesser extent, high-rise development is also occurring in the city's northern end, sometimes referred to as "Soho West". Due to their proximity, Jersey City's skyline is often pictured together with that of Lower Manhattan.

== History ==
Number of buildings by height in Jersey City by the end of each year. Click on the legend to toggle a specific height on or off. View chart definition.

== Cityscape ==
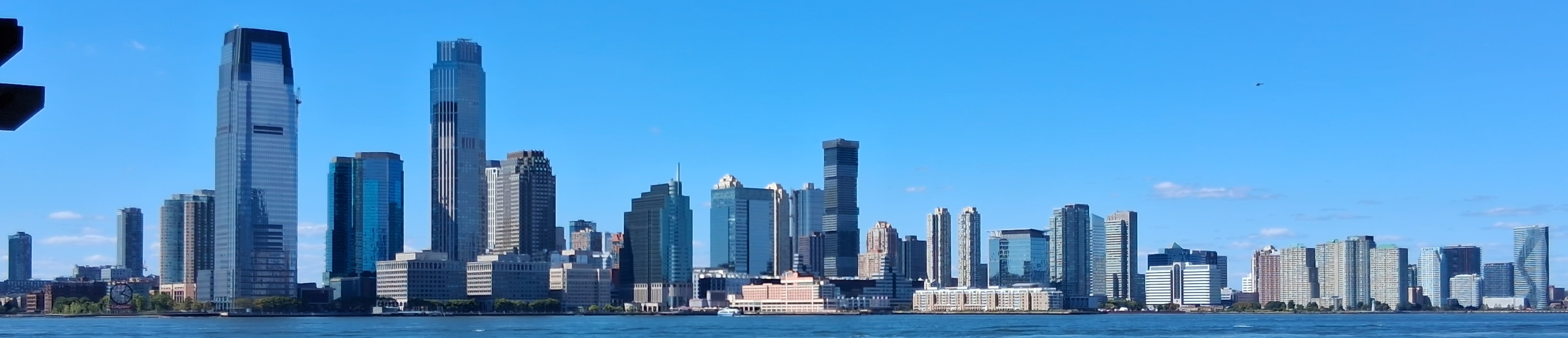
Skyline of Jersey City in 2025, as seen from Battery Park City in New York City

== Map of tallest buildings ==
The map below shows the location of every building taller than 300 feet (91 m) in Jersey City. Each marker is numbered by the building's height rank, and colored by the decade of its completion.

Buildings taller than 300 feet (91 m) in Jersey City.
- 1950s and before
- 1960s
- 1970s
- 1980s
- 1990s
- 2000s
- 2010s
- 2020s
1 99 Hudson Street
2 30 Hudson Street
3 Journal Squared Tower 2
4 The Journal Tower I
5 The Journal Tower II
6 Sable
7 55 Hudson
8 420 Marin Boulevard
9 Journal Squared Tower 3
10 Haus25
11 Journal Squared Tower 1
12 505 Summit
13 101 Hudson Street
14 235 Grand Street
15 Trump Plaza
16 Newport Tower
17 70 Columbus
18 90 Columbus
19 Exchange Place Centre
20 77 Hudson Street
21 Monaco North
22 Monaco South
23 70 Greene Street
24 Trump Bay Street
25 Harborside Plaza 5
26 480 Washington Boulevard
27 The Hendrix
28 M2
29 Ellipse
30 Vantage Tower One
31 Vantage Tower Two
32 Crystal Point
33 Marbella Apartments
34 Park and Shore
35 50 Columbus
36 88 Regent St
37 351 Marin Boulevard
38 VYV North
39 VYV South
40 151 Bay Street at Provost Square
41 The Morgan at Provost Square
42 Liberty View Towers East
43 Liberty View Towers West
44 The One
45 545 Washington Boulevard
46 A Condominiums
47 Bisby at Newport
48 Southampton Apartments
49 The Atlantic
50 Hudson House East
51 Aquablu
52 575 Washington Boulevard
53 Hudson House West
54 100 Clifton Place
55 East Hampton
56 The Riverside
57 The James Monroe
58 Cast Iron Lofts II
59 10 Provost
60 Plaza 10
61 425 Summit Avenue
62 Grove Point Apartments
63 International Financial Tower

== Tallest buildings ==
This list ranks buildings in Jersey City that stand at least 300 feet (91 m) tall, based on standard height measurement. This includes spires and architectural details but does not include antenna masts. The "Year" column indicates the year in which a building was completed. Buildings tied in height are ranked by year of completion with earlier buildings listed first, and then alphabetically.

Was the tallest building in Jersey City upon completion
Topped out but not yet completed

Rank	Name	Image	Location	Height ft (m)	Floors	Year	Purpose	Notes
1	99 Hudson Street		40°42′55″N 74°02′05″W	889 (271)	76	2020	Residential	As of July 2025, it is the 52nd-tallest building in the United States. Tallest residential building in the United States outside of New York or Chicago. Tallest building completed in Jersey City in the 2020s. Tallest building in New Jersey.
2	30 Hudson Street		40°42′47″N 74°02′02″W	781 (238.1)	42	2004	Office	Tallest building in Jersey City and the state of New Jersey from 2004 to 2018. Tallest office building in Jersey City. Was the tallest building in the United States that was not located in its metropolitan area's largest city from 2004 to 2020. Tallest building completed in Jersey City in the 2000s.
3	Journal Squared Tower 2		40°43′56″N 74°03′39″W	754 (229.8)	68	2021	Residential	Part of the three-tower Journal Squared complex. Tallest building in Journal Square.
4	The Journal Tower I		40°43′51″N 74°03′48″W	710 (216.4)	64	2025	Residential	Part of the two-tower The Journal complex. Formerly known as One Journal Square.
5	The Journal Tower II		40°43′53″N 74°03′49″W	710 (216.4)	64	2025	Residential	Part of the two-tower The Journal complex. Formerly known as One Journal Square.
6	Sable		40°43′13″N 74°02′05″W	700 (213.5)	70	2016	Residential	Formerly known as Jersey City Urby until April 2025. Also known as URL Harborside Tower I. Part of the planned three-tower Urby complex.
7	55 Hudson		40°42′50″N 74°02′07″W	649 (197.8)	57	2027	Residential	Part of a two-tower complex with 50 Hudson Street.
8	420 Marin Boulevard		40°43′27″N 74°02′24″W	634 (193.2)	60	2026	Residential	Phase 2 of the Hudson Exchange development plan.
9	Journal Squared Tower 3		40°43′57″N 74°03′37″W	633 (193)	60	2024	Residential	Part of the three-tower Journal Squared complex.
10	Haus25		40°43′04″N 74°02′19″W	626 (190.8)	57	2022	Residential	
11	Journal Squared Tower 1		40°43′57″N 74°03′40″W	574 (175)	53	2016	Residential	Part of the three-tower Journal Squared complex.
12	505 Summit		40°43′53″N 74°03′39″W	569 (173.5)	53	2026	Residential	Previously known as Pathside Tower.
13	101 Hudson Street		40°42′58″N 74°02′06″W	548 (167)	42	1992	Office	Tallest building in Jersey City from 1992 to 2004. Tallest building completed in Jersey City in the 1990s.
14	235 Grand Street		40°42′56″N 74°02′40″W	537 (163.7)	45	2019	Residential	
15	Trump Plaza		40°43′11″N 74°02′11″W	532 (162.2)	55	2008	Residential	
16	Newport Tower		40°43′37″N 74°02′08″W	531 (161.9)	37	1990	Office	Briefly the tallest building in Jersey City from 1990 to 1992.
17	70 Columbus		40°43′08″N 74°02′25″W	530 (161.4)	50	2015	Residential	
18	90 Columbus		40°43′10″N 74°02′27″W	530 (161.4)	50	2018	Residential	
19	Exchange Place Centre		40°43′00″N 74°02′00″W	515 (157.1)	32	1990	Office	Briefly the tallest building in Jersey City in 1990.
20	77 Hudson Street		40°42′53″N 74°02′06″W	509 (155.1)	48	2010	Residential	Also known as Hudson Green East Tower.
21	Monaco North		40°43′27″N 74°02′11″W	509 (155.1)	47	2011	Residential	
22	Monaco South		40°43′27″N 74°02′12″W	509 (155.1)	47	2011	Residential	
23	70 Greene Street		40°42′53″N 74°02′09″W	501 (152.8)	48	2010	Residential	Also known as Hudson Green West Tower.
24	Trump Bay Street		40°43′12″N 74°02′08″W	484 (147.5)	50	2017	Residential	
25	Harborside Plaza 5		40°43′08″N 74°02′05″W	480 (146.3)	34	2002	Office	
26	480 Washington Boulevard		40°43′30″N 74°02′05″W	461 (140.5)	32	2004	Office	Also known as Newport Office Center VII.
27	The Hendrix		40°43′14″N 74°02′29″W	460 (140) (Note: This building's height is not available from the CTBUH. The stated height was determined using Google Earth and is accurate to the nearest meter (approximately three feet).)	41	2022	Residential	Formerly known as MGM Marin Blvd, also known as 184 Morgan Street, and 331 Marin Boulevard.
28	M2		40°43′20″N 74°02′13″W	450 (137.2)	38	2016	Residential	Part of The BLVD Collection complex.
29	Ellipse		40°43′51″N 74°01′49″W	445 (135.5)	43	2017	Residential	
30	Vantage Tower One		40°42′49″N 74°02′41″W	440 (134.1)	44	2017	Residential	
31	Vantage Tower Two		40°42′48″N 74°02′37″W	440 (134.1)	44	2021	Residential	
32	Crystal Point		40°43′18″N 74°01′55″W	436 (132.9)	42	2009	Residential	
33	Marbella Apartments		40°43′22″N 74°02′12″W	427 (130.2)	40	2003	Residential	Tallest residential tower in Jersey City upon completion.
34	Park and Shore		40°43′51″N 74°02′00″W	414 (126.2)	37	2020	Residential	Also known as 75 Park Lane South.
35	50 Columbus		40°43′07″N 74°02′20″W	413 (125.9)	36	2007	Residential	
36	88 Regent St		40°42′56″N 74°02′57″W	407 (124)	34	2022	Residential	
37	351 Marin Boulevard	–	40°43′17″N 74°02′29″W	401 (122.1)	38	2022	Residential	
38	VYV North		40°43′28″N 74°02′16″W	389 (118.6)	35	2017	Residential	
39	VYV South		40°43′25″N 74°02′15″W	389 (118.6)	35	2017	Residential	
40	151 Bay Street at Provost Square	–	40°43′14″N 74°02′24″W	384 (117)	33	2024	Residential	
41	The Morgan at Provost Square	–	40°43′13″N 74°02′27″W	383 (116.7)	38	2015	Residential	
42	Liberty View Towers East		40°42′48″N 74°02′07″W	380 (115.8)	36	2002	Residential	
43	Liberty View Towers West		40°42′48″N 74°02′10″W	380 (115.8)	38	2002	Residential	
44	The One	–	40°43′18″N 74°02′16″W	375 (114.3)	35	2015	Residential	
45	545 Washington Boulevard	–	40°43′40″N 74°02′06″W	371 (113)	21	2001	Office	Also known as Newport Office Center IV.
46	A Condominiums	–	40°43′18″N 74°02′13″W	365 (111.3)	33	2008	Residential	
47	Bisby at Newport	–	40°43′56″N 74°01′56″W	350 (106.7)	33	2024	Residential	
48	Southampton Apartments		40°43′39″N 74°01′54″W	346 (105.5)	36	2000	Residential	
49	The Atlantic		40°43′36″N 74°01′51″W	344 (104.8)	35	1998	Residential	
50	Hudson House East	–	40°43′57″N 74°02′47″W	335 (102)	25	2021	Residential	
51	Aquablu	–	40°43′49″N 74°01′54″W	330 (100.6)	33	2009	Residential	
52	575 Washington Boulevard	–	40°43′44″N 74°02′07″W	330 (100)	21	2001	Office	
53	Hudson House West	–	40°43′57″N 74°02′50″W	322 (98)	25	2021	Residential	
54	100 Clifton Place	–	40°43′16″N 74°03′51″W	320 (97.5)	22	1936	Residential	Tallest building in Jersey City from 1936 to 1990.
55	East Hampton		40°43′40″N 74°01′51″W	320 (97.5)	32	1999	Residential	
56	The Riverside		40°43′36″N 74°01′55″W	318 (97)	32	1998	Residential	
57	The James Monroe		40°43′42″N 74°02′00″W	312 (95.1)	34	1988	Residential	
58	Cast Iron Lofts II	–	40°44′04″N 74°02′43″W	312 (95)	27	2016	Residential	
59	10 Provost	–	40°43′12″N 74°02′20″W	308 (94)	28	2018	Residential	
60	Plaza 10	–	40°43′15″N 74°01′55″W	308 (94)	19	2002	Office	
61	425 Summit Avenue	–	40°43′48″N 74°03′43″W	305 (93)	26	2024	Residential	
62	Grove Point Apartments	–	40°43′11″N 74°02′30″W	305 (93)	29	2007	Residential	
63	International Financial Tower	–	40°43′08″N 74°02′32″W	303 (92.4)	19	1989	Office	

== Tallest under construction or approved ==
=== Under construction ===
This table lists buildings under construction in Jersey City that are expected to be at least 300 ft (91 m) tall, as of 2026. The "Year" column indicates the estimated year of completion. A dash “–“ indicates information about the building is unknown or has not been released.

Name	Height ft (m)	Floors	Year	Notes
Harborside 8	708 (216)	68	–	Part of the larger Harborside complex.
Harborside 4	685 (209)	55	2029	Part of the larger Harborside complex.
Imperial Tower	637 (194)	56	–	Originally approved as a 35 story building. Construction started on foundation and lower floors then paused. In 2025, approved to expand to 56 stories with structural modifications to the existing five-story podium.
808 Pavonia Avenue Building 1	560 (171)	49	2027	Also known as 813 Pavonia Avenue.
20 Long Slip	526 (160)	47	2027	
50 Hudson	476 (145)	42	–	Part of a two-tower complex. Will begin construction when 55 Hudson is completed.
Homestead Gateway	402 (123)	34	–	Also known as 701 Newark Avenue.

=== Approved ===
This table lists approved buildings in Jersey City that are expected to be at least 300 ft (91 m) tall as of 2026, based on standard height measurement. A dash “–“ indicates information about the building is unknown or has not been released.

Name	Height ft (m)	Floors	Notes
Avalon Tower	722 (220)	70	Would be the fourth tallest building in both New Jersey and Jersey City upon completion.
30 Journal Square	718 (219)	68	Developer granted five year approval extension in 2022.
Jersey City Urby Tower 2	677 (206)	69	Part of the three-tower Urby complex.
Jersey City Urby Tower 3	677 (206)	69	Part of the three-tower Urby complex.
72 Montgomery Street	648 (198)	56	
808 Pavonia Avenue Building 4	620 (189)	56	
Harborside 9	607 (185)	57	Part of the larger Harborside complex.
2861 Kennedy Boulevard	588 (179)	55	Adjacent to the planned Art Walk next to the Loew's Theater.
310 Washington Street Tower 1	584 (178)	52	Final site plan approved for Tower 1. Tower 2 (50 stories) and Tower 3 (57 stories / 650 feet) received preliminary site plan approvals.
547 Summit Avenue	513 (156)	47	Homestead Market complex
555 Summit Avenue	513 (156)	47	Homestead Market complex
8-16 Lott Street	502 (153)	47	26 hotel rooms plus 1,049 residential units
560 Marin Boulevard	–	59	Approved in 2017. A three-year extension of the approval granted in 2021.
580 Marin Boulevard	–	57	Approved in 2017. A three-year extension of the approval granted in 2021.
500 Summit	–	42	Rights to develop were being bid for in April 2024.

== Timeline of tallest buildings ==
Name	Image	Street address	Years as tallest	Height ft (m)	Floors	Reference
Labor Bank Building (Note: This building was originally known as the Labor Bank Building, but has since been renamed 26 Journal Square.)		26 Journal Square	1928–1931	180 (55)	15	
The Orpheum		50 Baldwin Avenue	1931–1936	295 (90)	20	
B.S. Pollack Hospital		100 Clifton Place	1936–1990	320 (98)	22	
Exchange Place Center		10 Exchange Place	1990	515 (157)	30	
Newport Tower		525 Washington Boulevard	1990–1992	531 (162)	36	
101 Hudson Street		101 Hudson Street	1992–2004	548 (167)	42	
30 Hudson Street		30 Hudson Street	2004–2020	781 (238)	42	
99 Hudson Street		99 Hudson Street	2020–present	889 (271)	76	

== Skylines ==
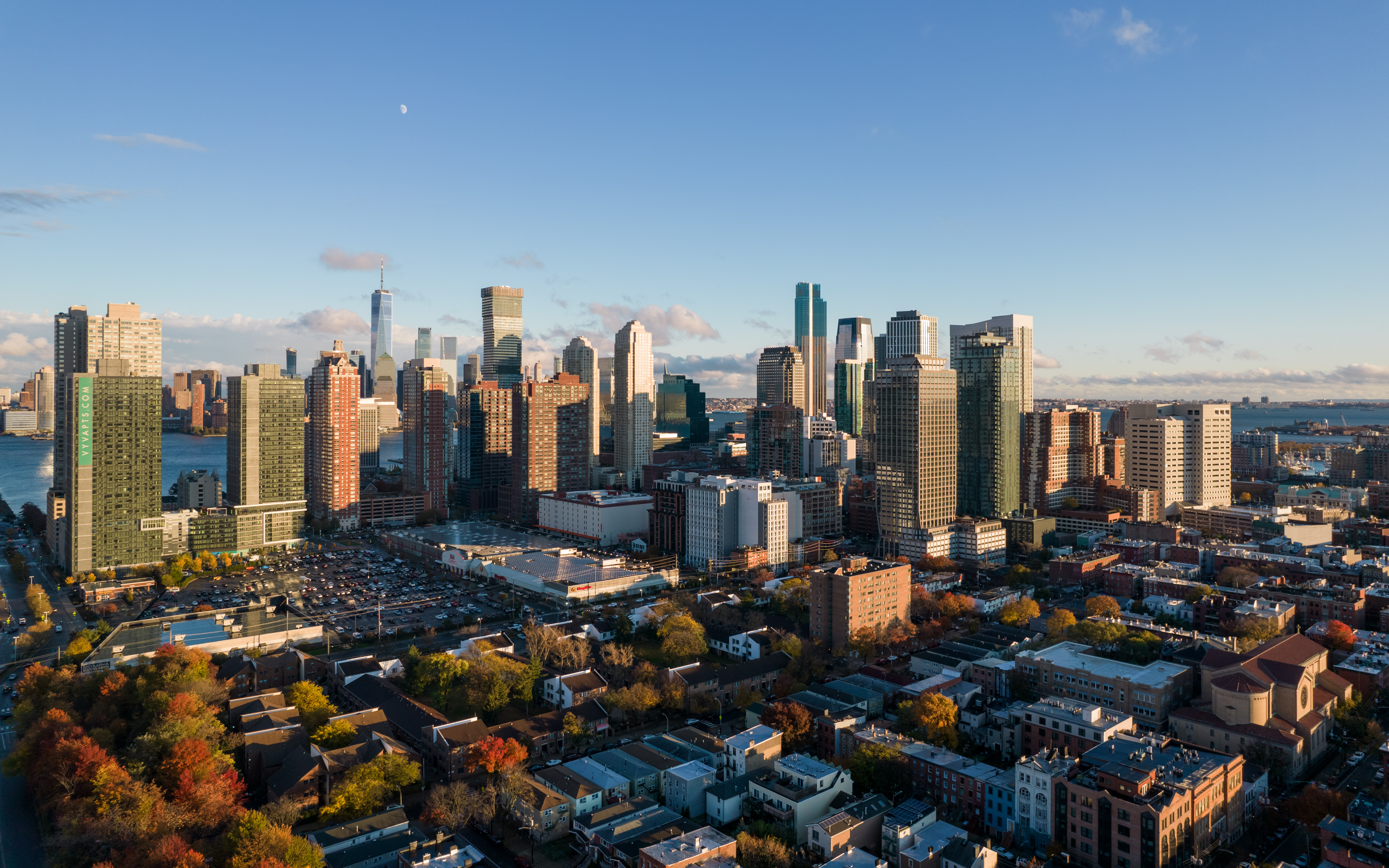
Downtown Jersey City

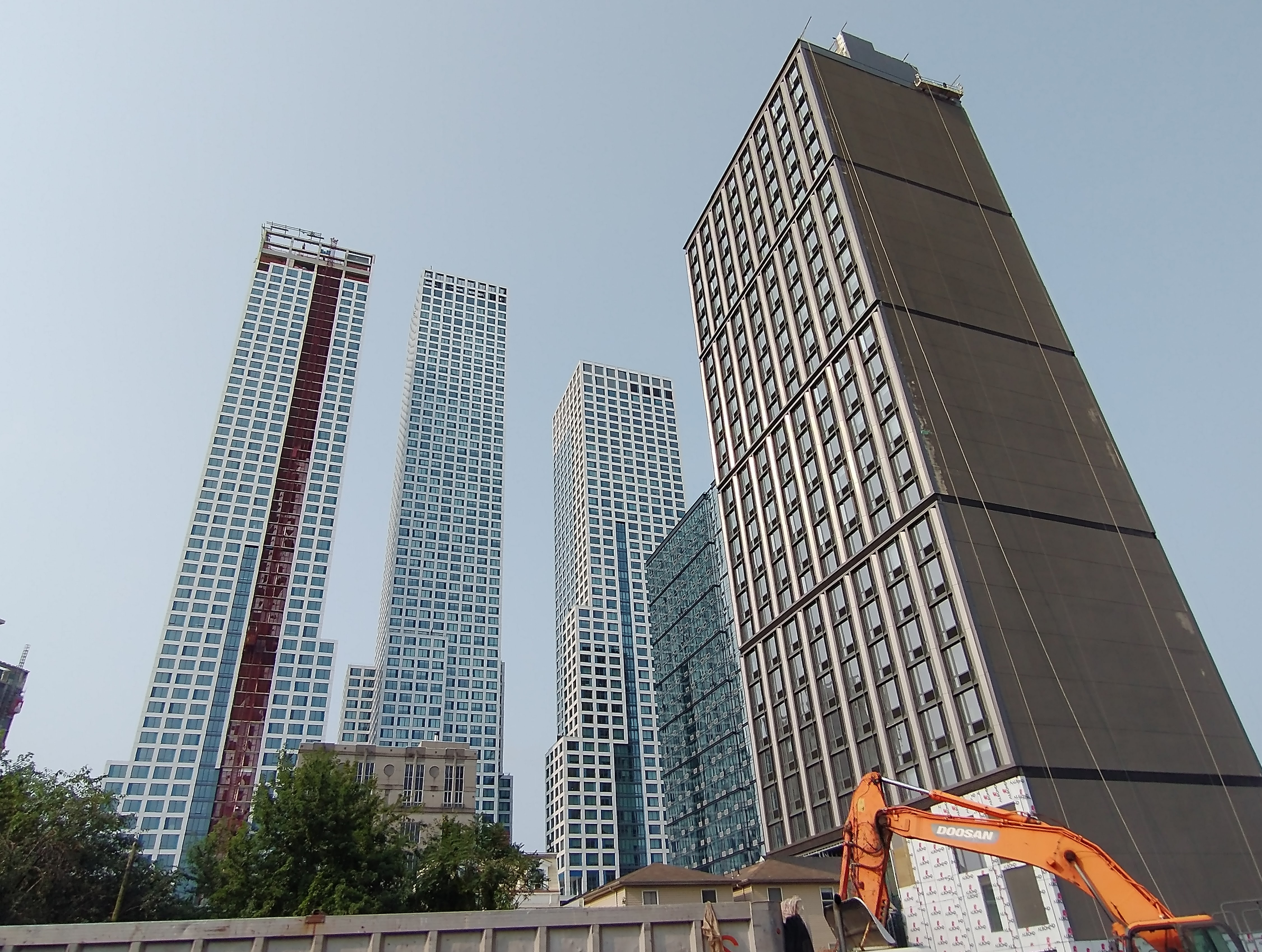
Journal Square

== See also ==
- Hudson Waterfront
- List of tallest buildings in Fort Lee
- List of tallest buildings in North Hudson
- List of tallest buildings in Newark
- List of tallest buildings in New Jersey
- List of tallest buildings in New York City
