= Twin Towers (disambiguation) =

The Twin Towers is a common name for two 110-story skyscrapers that were part of the original World Trade Center in New York City.

Twin Towers may also refer to:

== Architecture ==
- Twin towers (architecture)

== Buildings ==
=== North America ===
- Twin Towers Correctional Facility, Los Angeles, California
- Twin Towers (Marshall University), Huntington, West Virginia

=== Europe ===
- Deutsche Bank Twin Towers, Frankfurt, Germany
- Twin Towers, Wembley, part of the original Wembley Stadium, London
- Vienna Twin Tower, Vienna, Austria
- Tours Société Générale (English: Société Générale Twin Towers), Paris, France
- Buchanan Wharf, Glasgow, Scotland

=== Asia ===
- Petronas Towers, Kuala Lumpur, Malaysia
- Taipei Twin Towers, Taipei, Taiwan
- Panhsin Twin Towers, New Taipei, Taiwan
- Kaohsiung Twin Towers, Kaohsiung, Taiwan
- Salcedo Park Twin Towers, Makati, Philippines
- Guangzhou Twin Towers, Guangzhou, China
- Shimao Cross-Strait Plaza, Xiamen, China. Nicknamed "Xiamen Twin Towers"
- Al Kazim Twin Towers, Dubai, United Arab Emirates
- Noida Supertech Twin Towers, Noida, India
- Twin Towers (Ramat Gan), two identical office buildings in Ramat Gan, Israel

==== Oceania ====
- TNT Towers, Sydney, Australia

=== Previously proposed buildings ===
- Broadway Corridor Twin Towers, a 2017 skyscraper plan for Portland, Oregon
- Old Chicago Main Post Office Twin Towers, a 2011 skyscraper plan for Chicago, Illinois
- Twin Towers 2, a 2004 skyscraper plan for New York City

=== Architectural designs ===
- Twin Tower, a 1970s Hong Kong architectural design

== Film ==
- 9/11: The Twin Towers, a 2006 television special documentary film
- Twin Towers (film), a 2002 Oscar-winning documentary

== Sports ==
- Twin Towers (Houston Rockets), front court consisting of Ralph Sampson and Hakeem Olajuwon
- Twin Towers (San Antonio Spurs), front court consisting of Tim Duncan and David Robinson
- Twin Towers (professional wrestling), a former professional wrestling tag team consisting of Akeem and the Big Boss Man
- The Twin Towers, another former professional wrestling tag team consisting of Lex Luger and Barry Windham

== See also ==
- Category:Twin towers
- The Two Towers (disambiguation)
- List of tallest twin buildings and structures in the world
