= The Two Towers (disambiguation) =

The Two Towers is the second part of The Lord of the Rings by J. R. R. Tolkien.

The Two Towers may also refer to:

== Geographical locations ==
- The medieval Two Towers, Bologna, found in the Piazza di Porta Ravegnana, Bologna, Italy

== Films ==
- The Lord of the Rings: The Two Towers, a 2002 film adaptation of the novel directed by Peter Jackson

== Videogames ==
- The Two Towers (MUD), a 1994 multi-user online role-playing game
- The Lord of the Rings: The Two Towers (video game), a 2002 video game based on the film

== Board games ==
- Two Towers (game), a 1975 board wargame based on The Lord of the Rings

== See also ==
- Twin Towers (disambiguation)
