= Old Chicago Main Post Office =

Office building in Chicago, Illinois

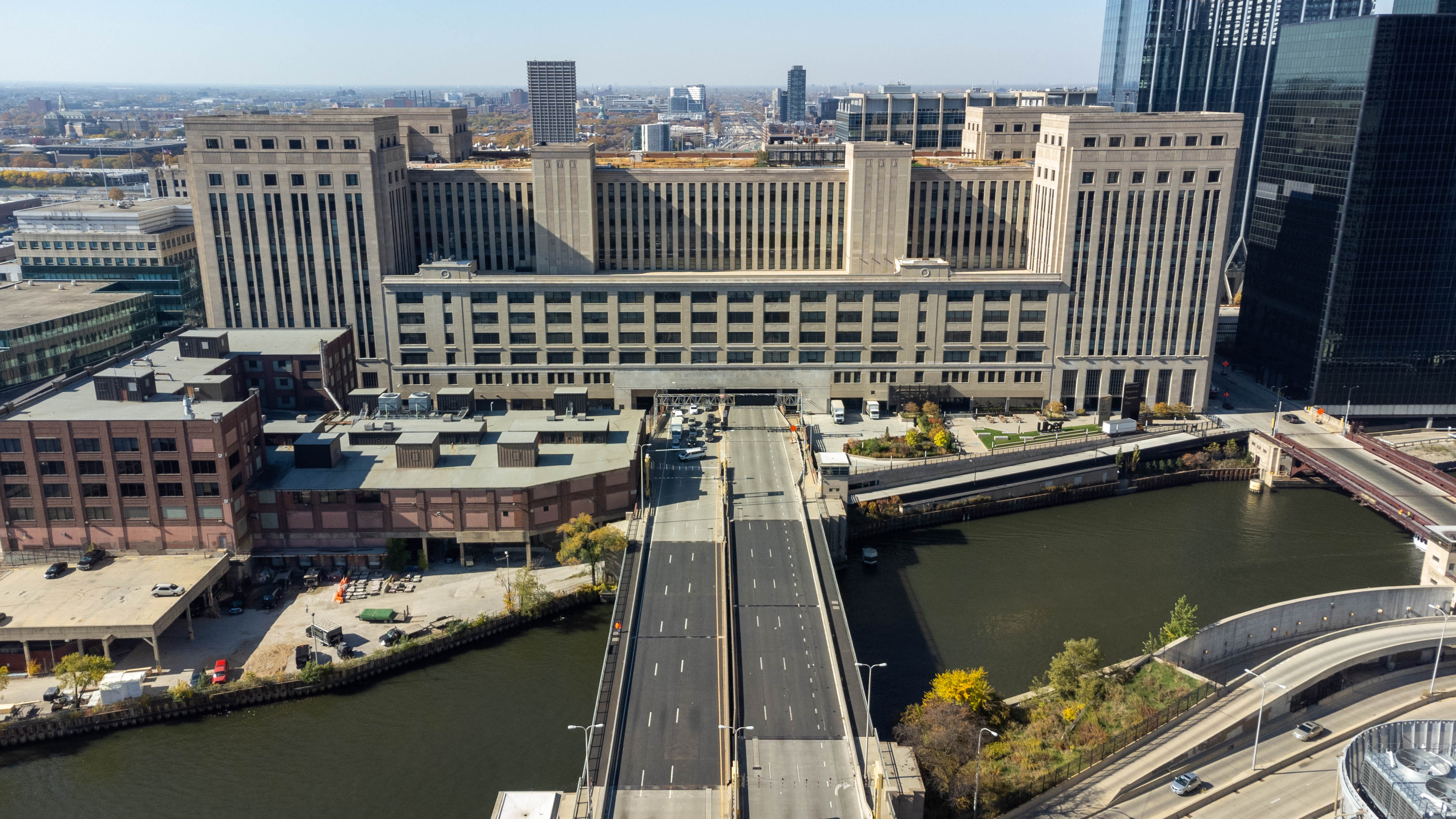
- Old Main Post Office over Ida B. Wells Drive

General information
- Location: Chicago, Illinois, 433 West Van Buren Street
- Coordinates: 41.875622°N 87.638769°W
- Opened: 1921; 105 years ago
- Renovated: 1932; 94 years ago

Design and construction
- Architecture firm: Graham, Anderson, Probst & White

Website
- post433.com
- United States Post Office—Chicago
- U.S. National Register of Historic Places
- Location within Chicago metropolitan area Location within Illinois
- Location: 433 W. Van Buren St., Chicago, Illinois
- Coordinates: 41°52′34″N 87°38′19″W
- Area: less than one acre
- Built: 1921
- Architects: Graham, Anderson, Probst & White
- Architectural style: Classical Revival, Art Deco
- NRHP reference No.: 01000868
- Added to NRHP: August 16, 2001

The Old Chicago Main Post Office is a nine-story-tall office building in downtown Chicago, Illinois, U.S. The building was designed by Graham, Anderson, Probst & White and built in 1921. The structure of the building was expanded greatly in 1932 to serve Chicago's great volume of postal business, increased significantly by the mail-order businesses of Montgomery Ward (the largest retailer in the United States) and of Sears (its competitor). The building is listed on the National Register of Historic Places.

In 1997, the post office moved to a modern processing center nearby and the building was sold by the U.S. Postal Service for redevelopment in 2009. After an extensive restoration project, the Old Post Office became home to many corporate offices including Ferrara Candy Company, PepsiCo, Cisco Systems, Uber, CBOE, Home Chef, Vizient, Inc., and more.

== History ==
=== Use as post office ===
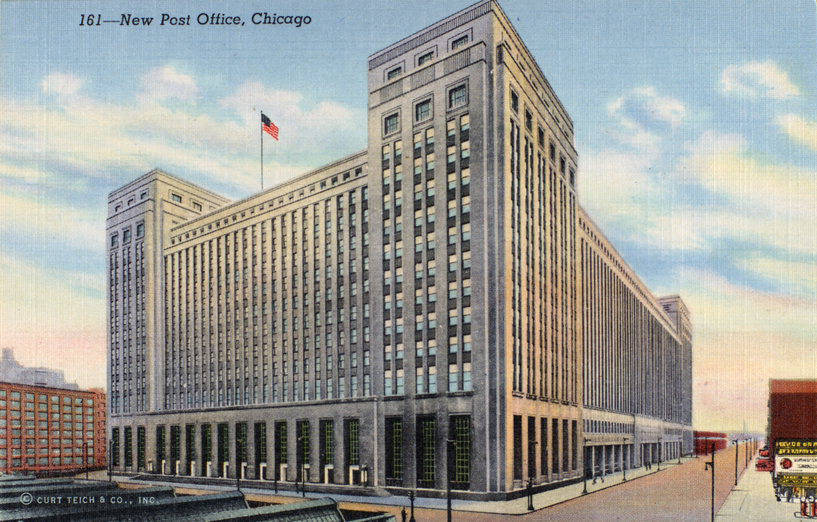
A postcard commemorating the expanded Chicago Post Office dedication, February 15, 1933

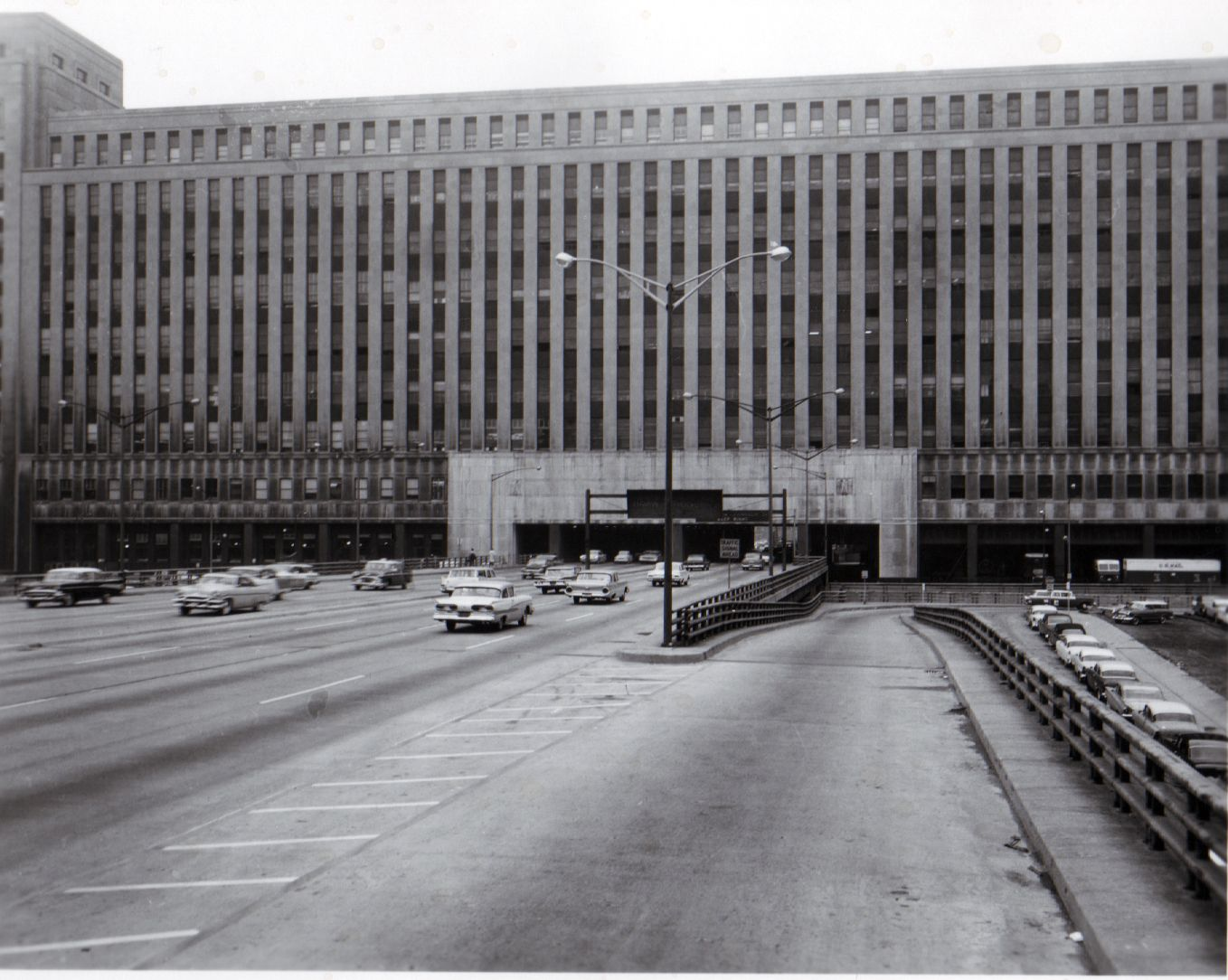
Highway traffic passing through the building, 1969

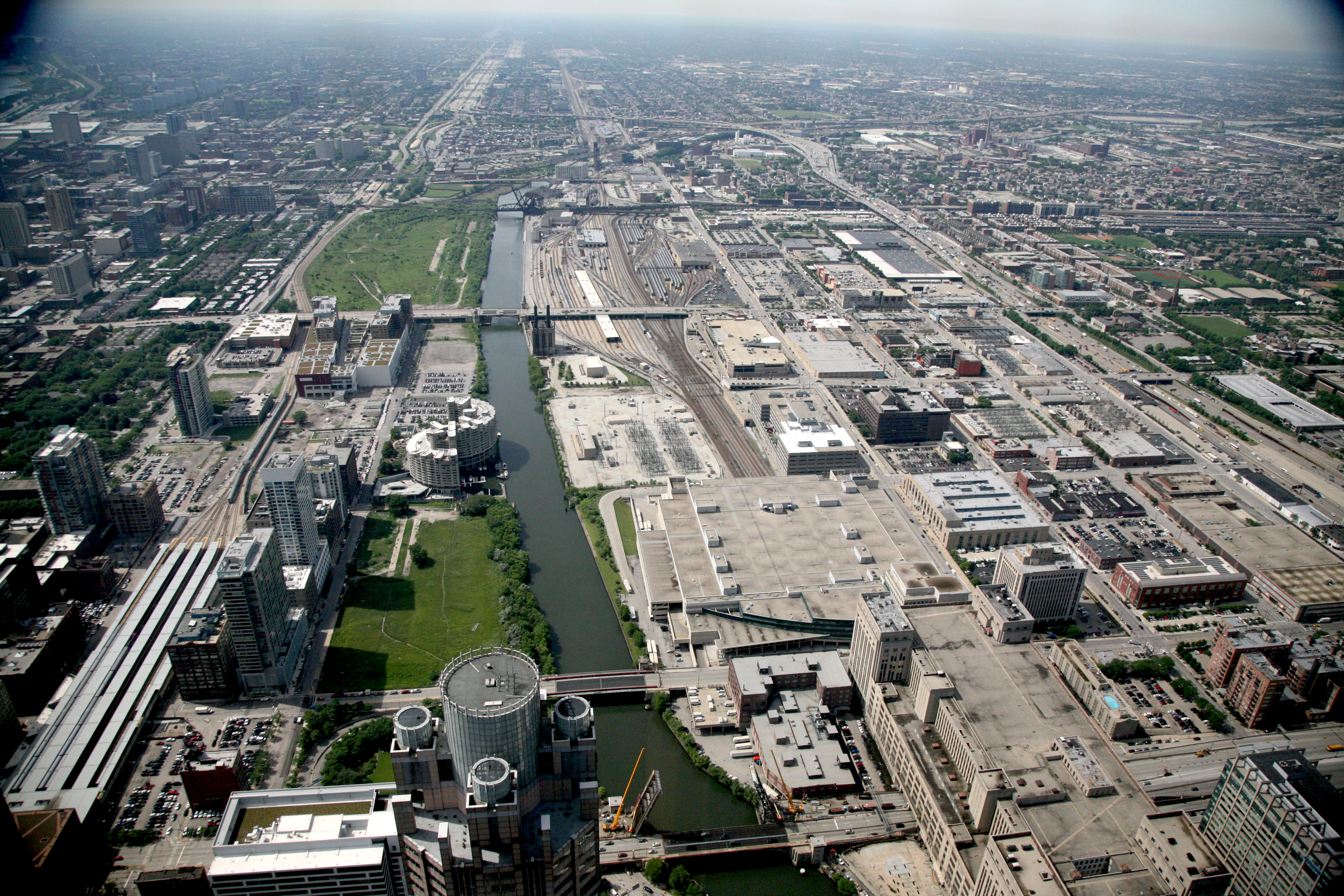
Aerial view of Chicago, facing south, with the Old Chicago Main Post Office visible in the bottom right

The original 1922 structure was a brick-sided mail terminal building, sited just east of the main building that spans the Eisenhower Expressway as it turns into Ida B. Wells Drive. Major expansion in 1932 added a total of nine floors, for more than 60 acres (2,600,000 ft^{2}; 240,000 m^{2}) of floorspace. Its footprint, as initially designed, would have blocked the proposed Congress Parkway extension; as a compromise, a hole for the Parkway was reserved in the base of the Post Office and utilized twenty years later. Competitors Montgomery Ward and Sears combined to make Chicago "the nation's mail-order capital". (Montgomery Ward, which became the largest retailer in the United States in the late 1930s, was eventually passed by Sears, and then was purchased and merged.) In 1966, the Main Chicago Post Office came to a halt when a logjam of 10 million pieces of mail clogged the system for nearly a week. With Chicago rated worst in postal deliveries, a new Main Post Office to be located right across Harrison Street was proposed. In 1997, the old building was vacated in favor of the new, modernized facility. The building was listed on the National Register of Historic Places in 2001.

A February 2006 report by the General Accounting Office stated, that it cost the government $2 million a year to maintain the retired building. On June 9, 2009, the Chicago Sun-Times reported that the postal service was placing the post office on the auction block. Held on August 27 and conducted by Rick Levin & Associates Inc., the auction raised $40 million, which was well over the opening bid of $300,000. The buyer was reported to be English real estate developer Bill Davies, who led International Properties Developments (IPD). While Davies missed an October 10, 2009 deadline to close the deal, he finally acquired the building on October 21, 2009, paying about $17 million.

=== Redevelopment plan, 2011–2014 ===
Old Chicago Main Post Office Phase II

General information
- Status: Never built
- Type: Supertall skyscraper
- Location: Chicago, Illinois, West Ida B. Wells Drive and South Canal Street, 433 West Van Buren, United States
- Cost: $3.5 billion

Height
- Roof: 2,000 feet (610 m)

Technical details
- Floor count: 9
- Floor area: 16 million ft^{2} (1,500,000 m^{2})

Design and construction
- Architect: Booth Hansen
- Developer: International Property Developers

The Old Chicago Main Post Office Redevelopment was an approved 20-acre (81,000 m^{2}) project on a lot located along the Chicago River on the southwest side of Downtown Chicago, Illinois to be constructed in phases over a period of one decade that would have included the renovation of the building as well as residential, retail, entertainment and office space. The plan included several towers, the tallest one being a proposed 120-story mixed use twin tower skyscraper to stand about 2,000 feet (610 m) high to the roof, which would have made it the tallest building in the United States, over 500 feet (150 m) taller than the Willis Tower, containing office, residential, and hotel space. It would also have included two 60-story residential towers as well as a 40-story hotel. All the buildings in the development were to be connected via a ground-level complex that would have been built over the Chicago River and the Eisenhower Expressway. More specifically, it was exactly one year and nine months after acquiring the post office property from the Postal Service when Davies unveiled his plan for the Post Office on July 21, 2011. The proposal, which involved three other properties besides the 14-story Post Office, was broken down into three phases pending the required $3.5 billion in funding:

- Phase 1: Converting the Post Office into a retail complex whose main entrance would be through the Beaux Arts-inspired lobby along Van Buren street, the remaining interior would become a parking garage, and a 40-story hotel on the east side of the building (approximate cost: $450 million).
- Phase 2: Building a 60-story hotel west of the Post Office and a 120-story, 2,000 ft (610 m) office, hotel, and residential tower that would be the tallest in North America (approximate cost: $2 billion).
- Phase 3: Two residential towers built on the east side of the Chicago River diagonally southeast from the proposed 120-story skyscraper plus a 12,000 space parking garage (approximate cost: $1 billion).

The whole $3.5 billion plan was submitted to the Chicago City Council and the Planning Commission for approval the same day it was released to the public. Only funding for Phase 1 had been secured as of July 21, 2011. The proposal was sent to the Chicago City Commission in July 2011 for approval, which was expected to be a several-month process. The project had an estimated cost of $3.5 billion and the potential to create 12,000 jobs. Some critics opposed the proposal, calling it old-fashioned and suburban and an unrealistic pipe dream, as it was largely car oriented (12,000 parking spaces and free parking) with shopping mall style retail.

In May 2013, the architectural firm Antunovich Associates created a new proposal on the site featuring a 1000-foot skyscraper (with a 2,000 foot tower in their 2nd phase). Other potential uses included a casino and/or entertainment complex. The city voted and approved the plan July 18, 2013.

On June 18, 2014, Bill Davies announced the formation of a $500 million joint venture with Sterling Bay Companies for phase I of the redevelopment. On July 18, Sterling announced a new relationship with J.P. Morgan Asset Management, which gave them access to new financial resources. However, Davies never found sufficient financing. In December 2014, Davies canceled the project and put the post office building up for sale. Davies proposed an ambitious redevelopment plan that was never realized; on May 13, 2016, the building was sold by Davies, who died the next day.

=== 2016 sale and reconstruction ===
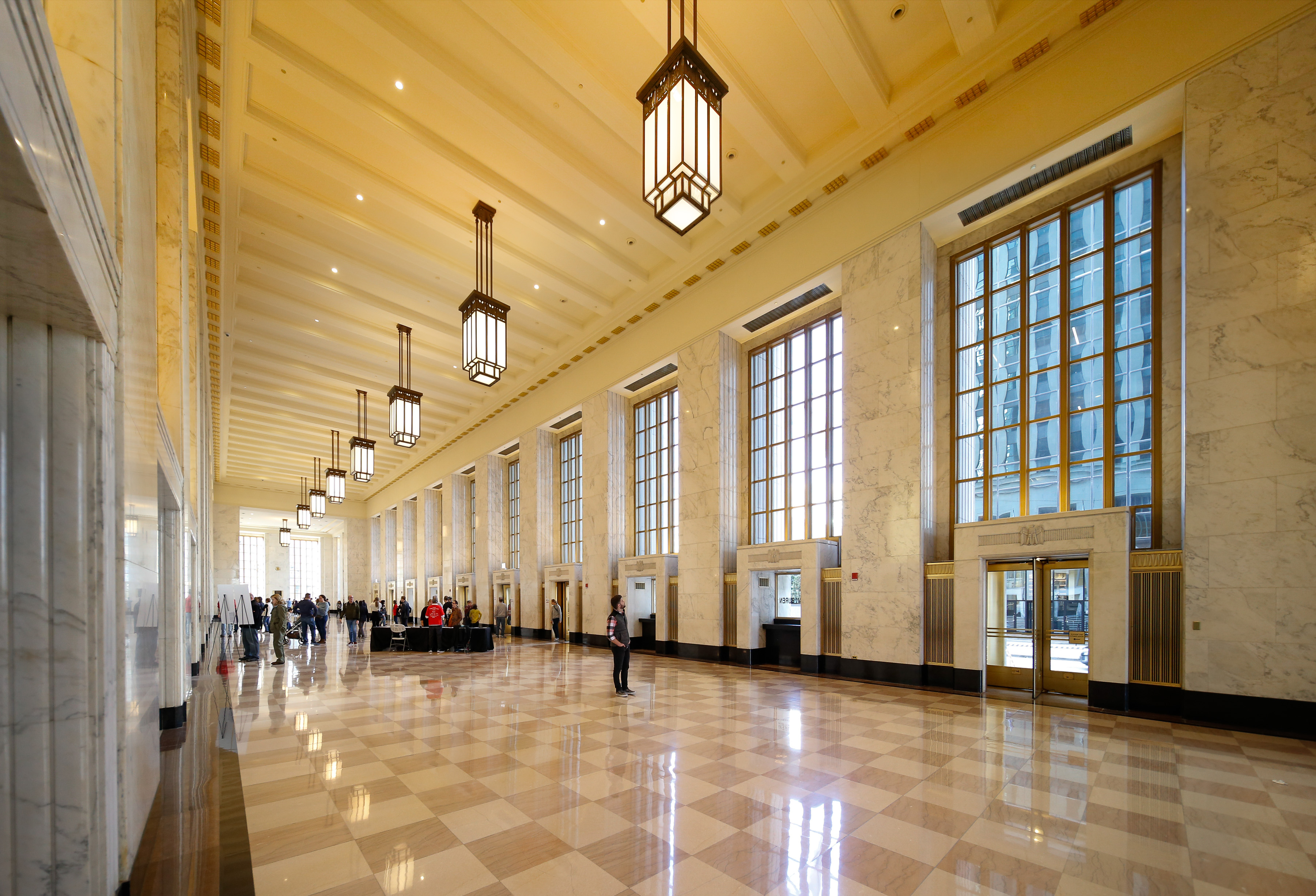
Interior in 2019

In February 2016, Chicago mayor Rahm Emanuel pressed for development of the site, threatening to take possession of the building by use of eminent domain. In March, the city's Department of Planning and Development issued an RFP seeking bids due June 10 for redevelopment of the site. Later that week, it was announced that the Old Chicago Post Office would be sold to 601W, a New York City-based real estate company which owns Chicago's Aon Center and One Prudential Plaza buildings. Davies had been in negotiations to sell the building since May 2015.

On May 13, 2016, Emanuel announced that Davies had sold the building to 601W; however, Davies had died the previous week. Vicky Flores, who ran the Chicago office of Davies' firm, commented: "It was really weird, the timing. Everything was signed off, and then I heard he had died. It was like he waited until everything was taken care of." Gensler was hired to redesign the space into office space, with addition of a rooftop park and a riverwalk. The project was supposed to cost $500 million but ended up at $800 million. In September 2017 the post office was one of 6 sites in Chicago considered for the new Amazon "HQ2" location.

In August 2019, Uber signed a 10-year lease to become the building's largest tenant, occupying 463,000 square feet (43,000 m^{2}). The structure will also include new Chicago offices for Walgreens, occupying 200,000 square feet (19,000 m^{2}) and housing 1,800 employees. PepsiCo will relocate its Chicago office of 1,300 employees and occupy 192,000 square feet (17,800 m^{2}), while the Ferrara Candy Company announced that it would relocate its headquarters to the Post Office building in 2019, occupying 77,000 square feet (7,200 m^{2}) and bringing nearly 400 jobs. The Federal Home Loan Bank of Chicago will also be a tenant. After extensive renovations undertaken by 601W, the building opened to office tenants in October 2019, with Walgreens and Ferrara Candy becoming the first tenants. Construction on the space utilized by Uber was scheduled to begin in the spring of 2020, and the Uber Freight hub opened the next year. Within 18 months of the project's completion, four-fifths of the space had been leased, and the building had received a LEED Gold green-building certification.

== Tenants ==
As of the 2020s tenants include (those who had moved in or had signed leases):

- Cboe Global Markets
- Cisco Systems
- Chicago Sun-Times
- Federal Home Loan Banks
- Ferrara Candy Company
- Home Chef
- PepsiCo
- Uber
- Tempo Global Resources
- Walgreens
- Milwaukee Tool
- Vizient, Incorporated
- WBEZ radio
- A food court
- Many others

== In popular culture ==
The building was used in the filming of Batman Begins in 2004, and The Dark Knight in April 2007.

The building is seen from above in the opening credits of Candyman. In the summer of 2010, Paramount Pictures and Michael Bay filmed numerous scenes for Transformers: Dark of the Moon in and around Chicago. The old Chicago Post Office's east facade was decorated as the "Department of Health and Human Services" where the Autobots were kept by the federal government in the movies. The same interior that was used for filming of the bank heist in The Dark Knight was used again for Transformers: Dark of the Moon. There were also some scattered shots from the Post Office interior used throughout the film.

== See also ==
- List of United States post offices
- National Register of Historic Places listings in West Side Chicago
