= List of tallest twin buildings and structures =

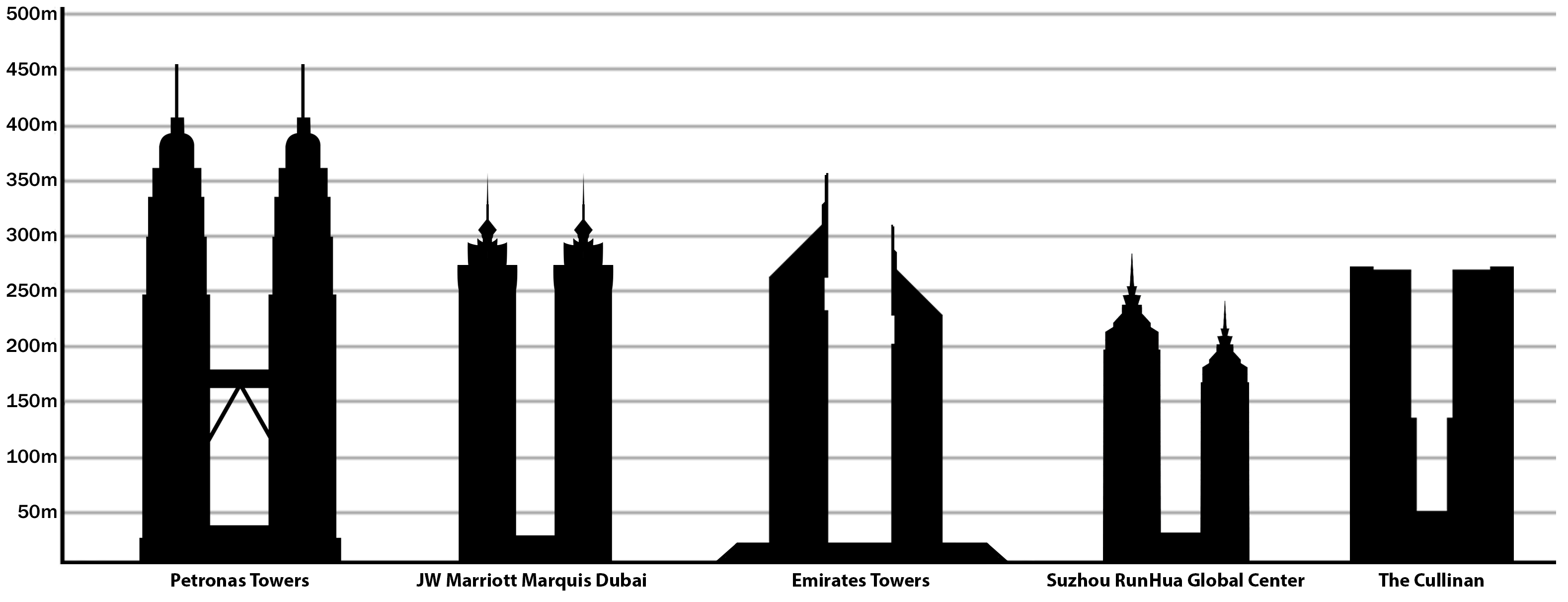
Tallest twin buildings in the world

The term Twin towers in architecture refers to two tall structures with nearly identical characteristics and similar height, usually constructed close to each other and part of a single complex. The charts below lists most twin and other multi-column structures with similar characteristics. Buildings and structures shorter than 92 m (302 ft) are not included.

== Twin buildings ==
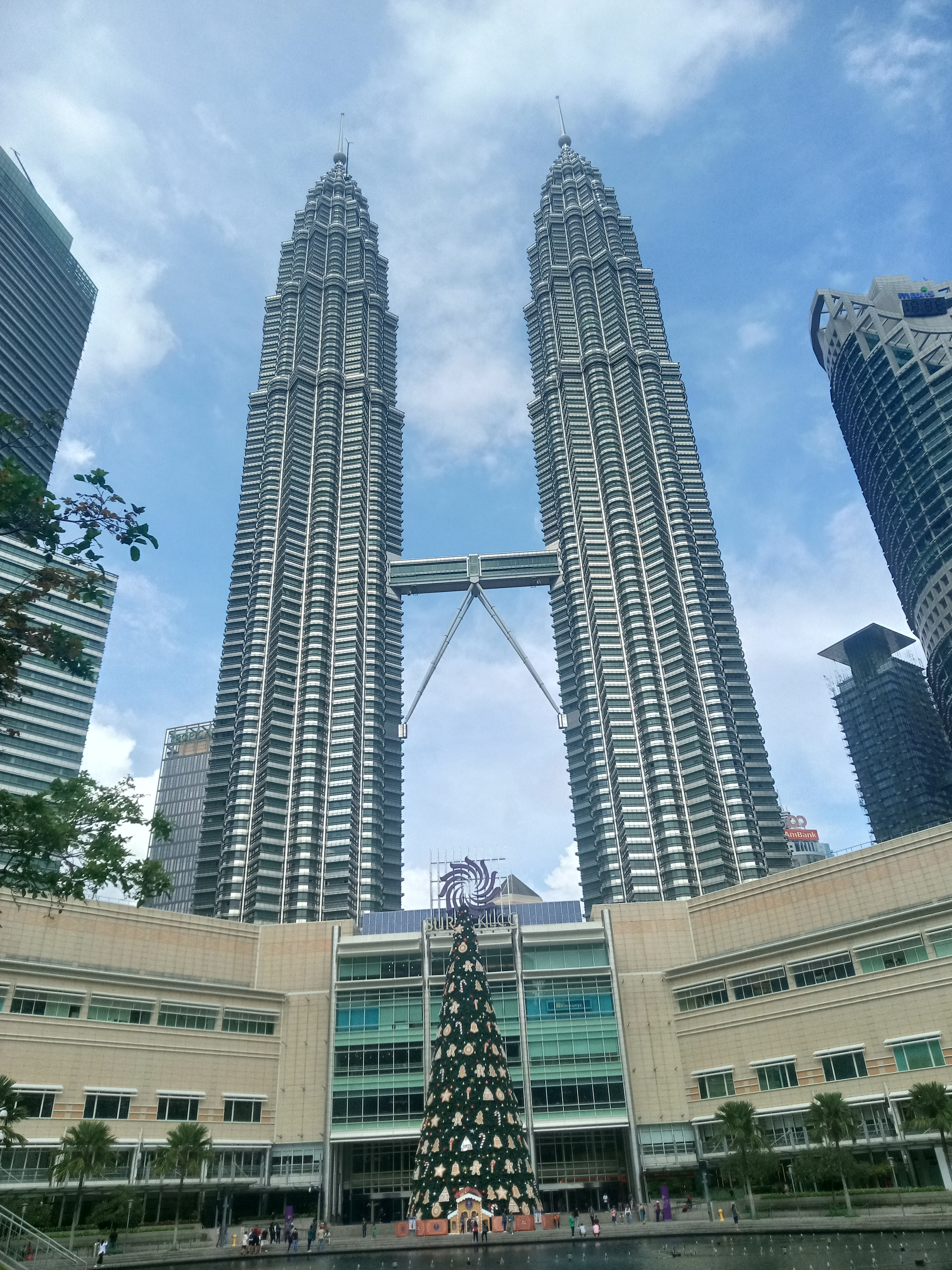
The Petronas Twin Towers located in Kuala Lumpur are currently the tallest-twin buildings in the world.

Legend
Indicates buildings still under construction that have been architecturally topped out but not yet fully opened
All Buildings currently under construction.
All Buildings approved.
All Buildings stopped construction.
All buildings which were originally proposed as a pair of buildings, but only one was built.

=== Completed or topped-out buildings ===
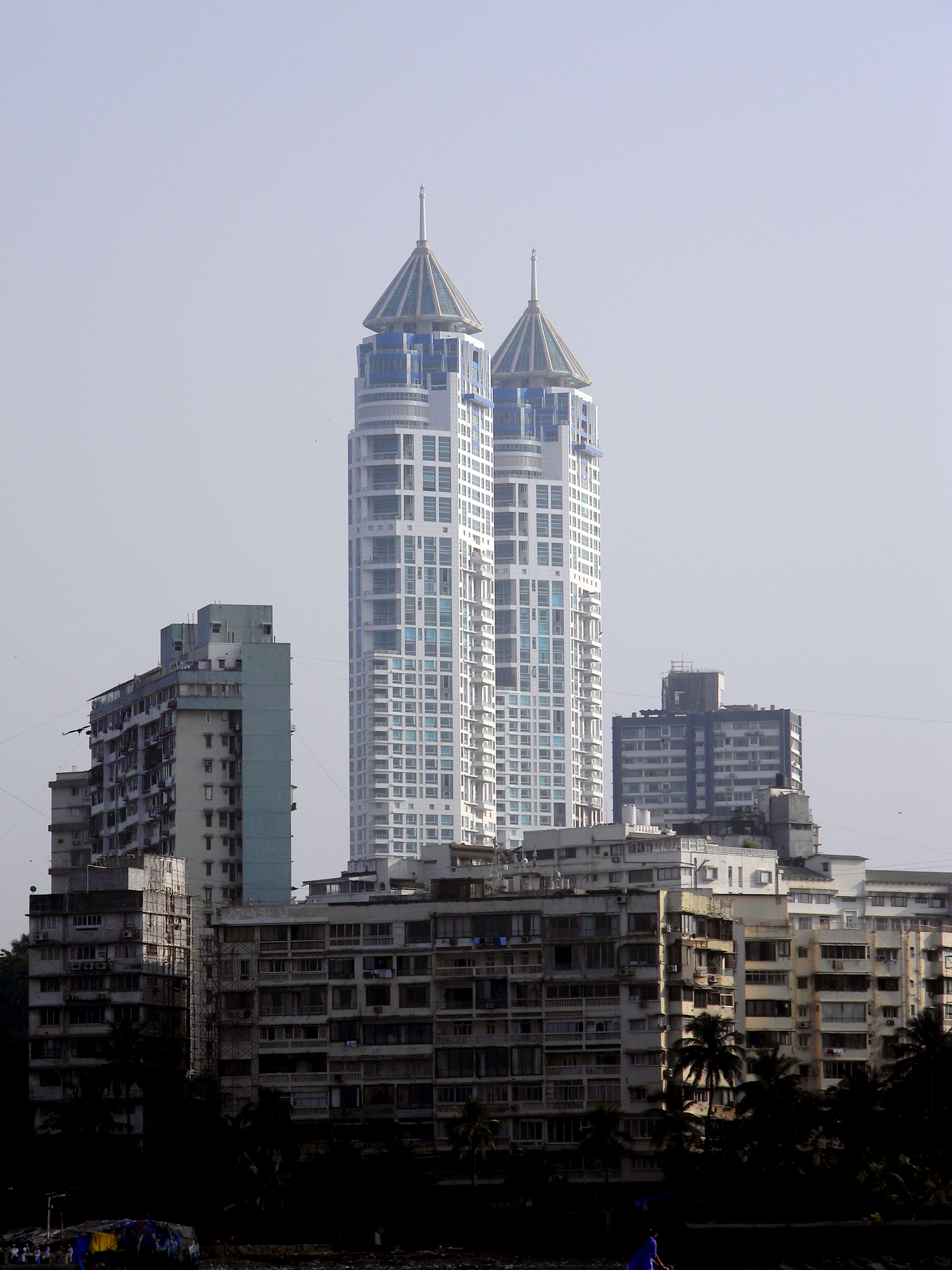
The Imperial Twin Towers in Mumbai, India.

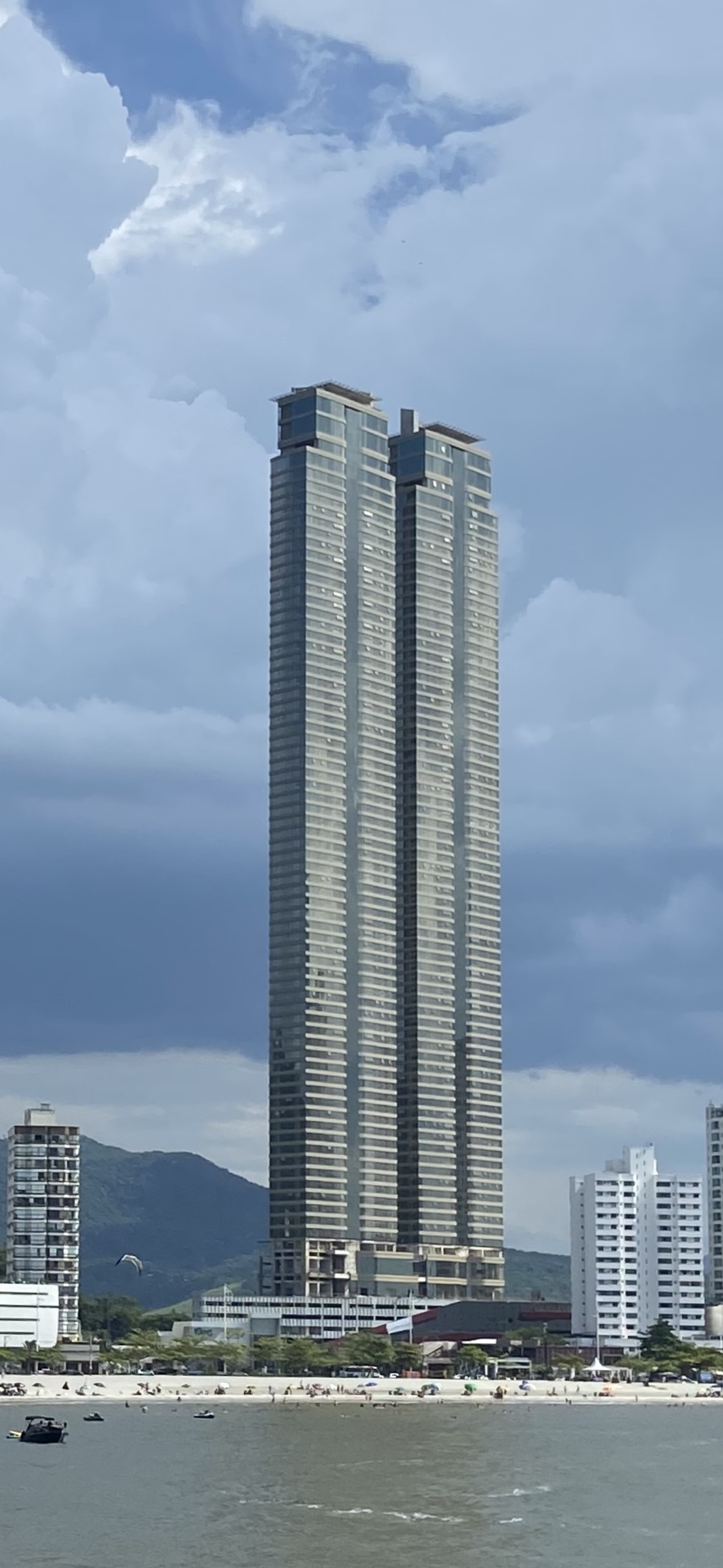
Yachthouse Residence Club in Brazil serve as the tallest twin towers in the Western Hemisphere.

JW Marriott Marquis Dubai, the third tallest twin buildings in the world. It is also the world's second tallest hotel globally.

The St. Francis Shangri-La Place, Philippines

Colombo's WTC towers on the right—the tallest twin buildings in Sri-Lanka. Also visible the BOC tower on the left, the Galadari hotel and the Presidential Secretariat.

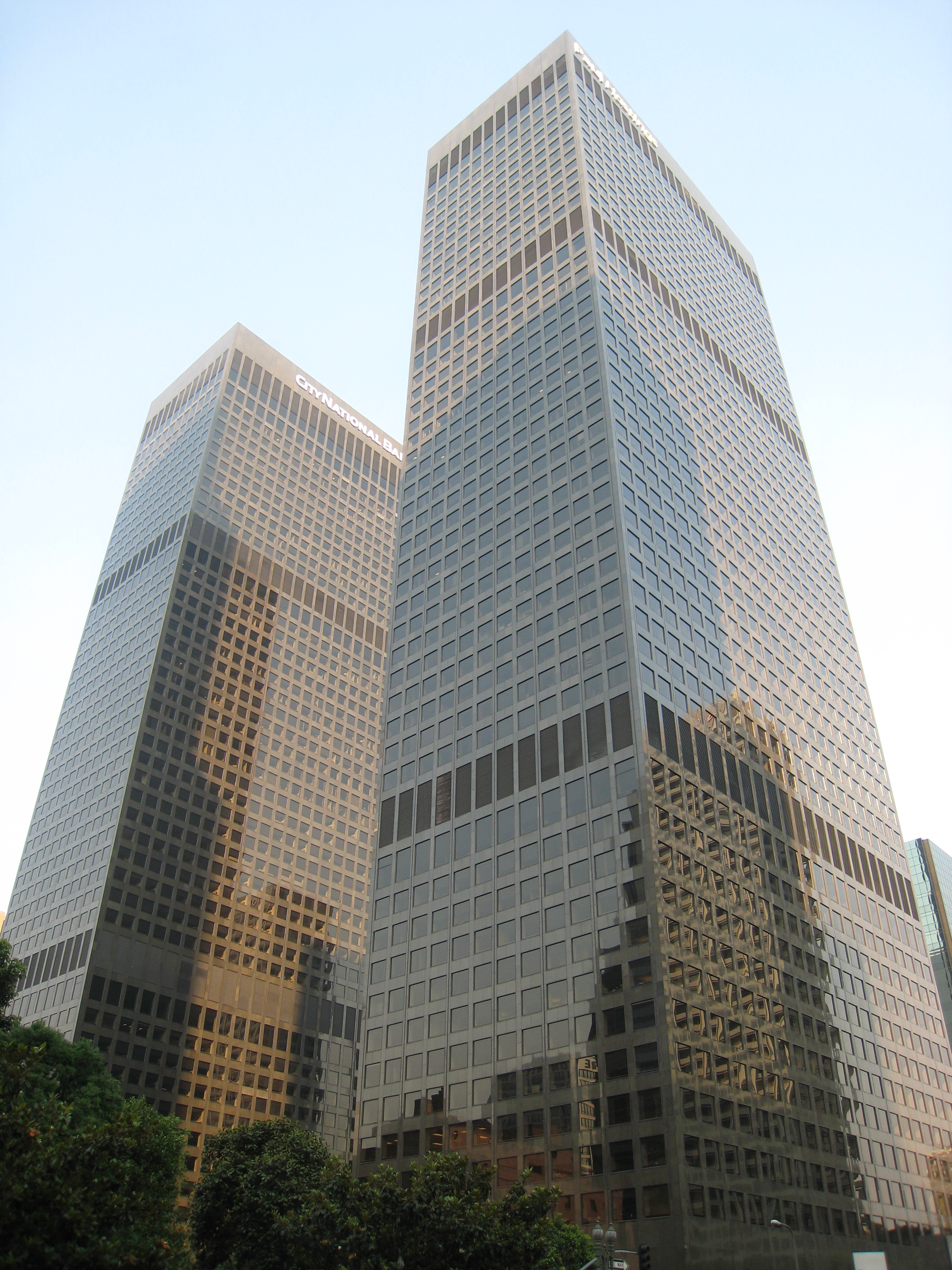
City National Plaza, in Los Angeles, was briefly the tallest twin building complex in the world, until the NYC World Trade Center was completed.

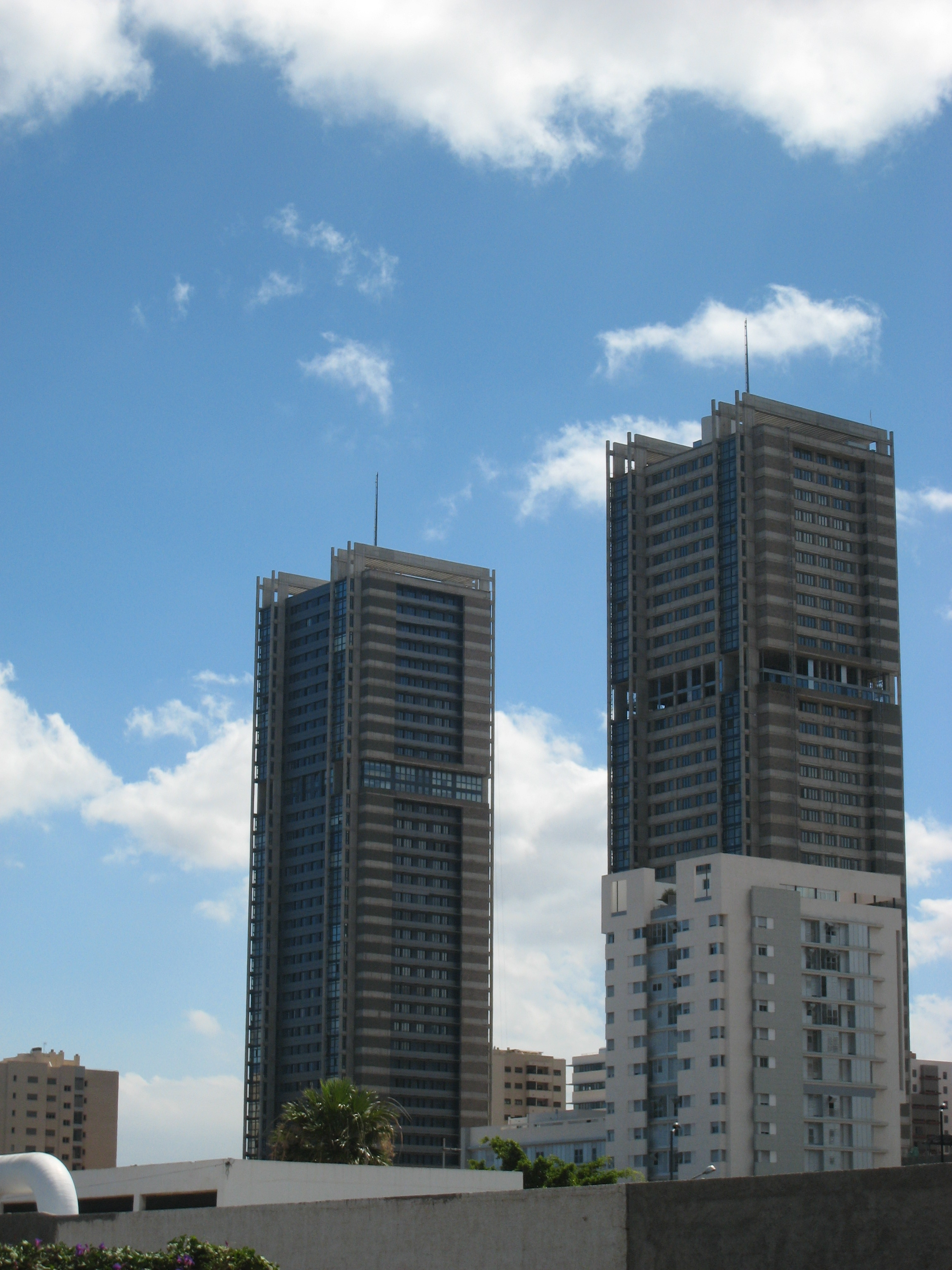
The Torres de Santa Cruz on Tenerife are the tallest twin buildings in Spain.

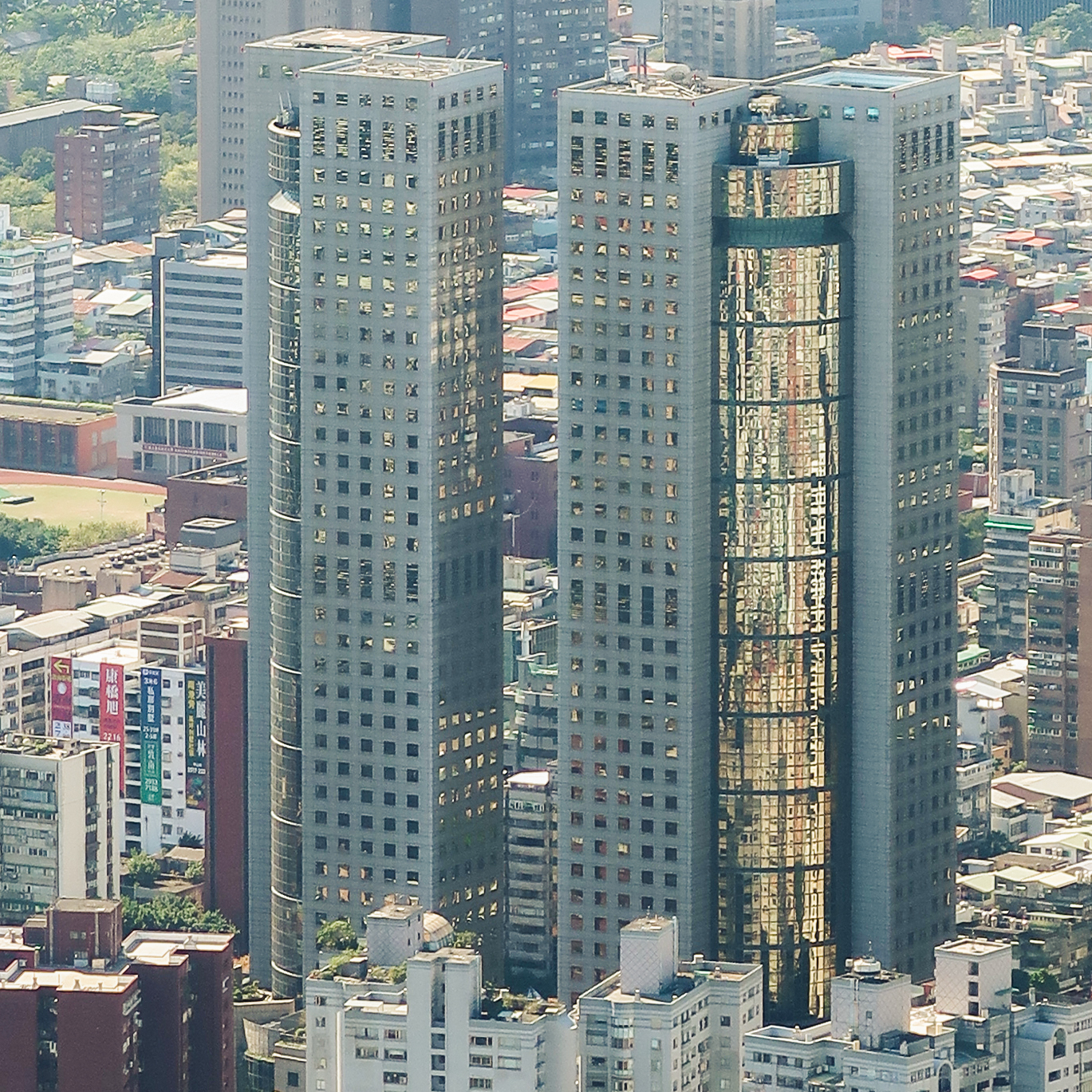
Taipei's Far Eastern Plaza resides as the tallest twin buildings in Taiwan.

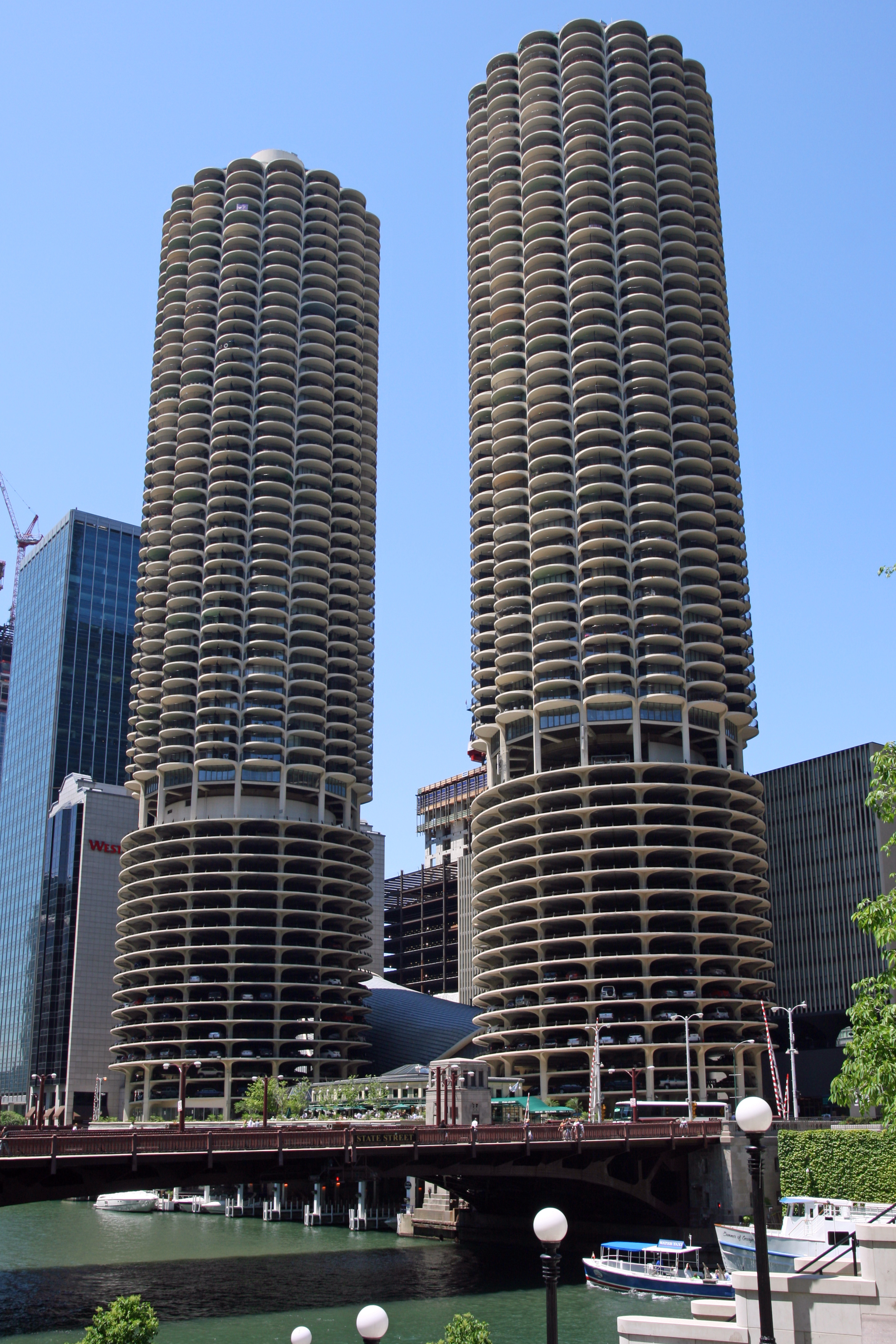
Marina City, Chicago, the tallest twin buildings in the world when they were completed in the 1960s

The following list includes only twin buildings that are continuously habitable over 90 m (300 ft).

Name	City	Country	Max. height	Floors	Notes
Petronas Twin Towers	Kuala Lumpur	Malaysia	451.9 m (1,483 ft)	88/88	Tallest twin buildings in the world. Formerly two of the world's tallest buildings overall.
Shenzhen Galaxy Twin Towers	Shenzhen	China	356 m (1,168 ft)	71/71	
JW Marriott Marquis Dubai	Dubai	United Arab Emirates	355.4 m (1,166 ft)	77/77	
Emirates Towers	Dubai	United Arab Emirates	354 m (1,161 ft)	54/56	
Huaguoyuan Towers	Guiyang	China	335 m (1,099 ft)	74/74	
Sumou Towers	Jeddah	Saudi Arabia	310 m (1,017 ft)	71/63	Tallest twin buildings in Saudi Arabia.
Greenland Hangzhou Center	Hangzhou	China	304 m (997 ft)	64/64	
One Za'abeel	Dubai	United Arab Emirates	301.4 m (989 ft)	68/59	
City of Capitals	Moscow	Russia	301 m (988 ft)	76/65	Tallest twin buildings in Europe.
Lusail Plaza Towers	Lusail	Qatar	301 m (988 ft)	68/68	
Yachthouse Residence Club	Balneario Camboriu	Brazil	295 m (968 ft)	81/81	Tallest twin buildings in the Americas
Skyland Istanbul	Istanbul	Turkey	280 m (919 ft)	65/65	Tallest twin buildings in the Turkey
The Astaka	Johor Bahru	Malaysia	278.8 m (915 ft)	67/72	
The Cullinan	Hong Kong	China	270 m (886 ft)	68/68	
Al Kazim Towers	Dubai	United Arab Emirates	265 m (869 ft)	53/53	
Grand Gateway Shanghai	Shanghai	China	262 m (860 ft)	52/52	
Bahrain Financial Harbour	Manama	Bahrain	260 m (853 ft)	53/53	
Three Sixty West	Mumbai	India	260 m (853 ft)	52/66	
The Imperial	Mumbai	India	256 m (840 ft)	60/60	
One Avighna Park	Mumbai	India	251.3 m (824 ft)	61/61	
Palm Towers	Doha	Qatar	251 m (823 ft)	58/58	
Angsana Hotel & Suites	Dubai	United Arab Emirates	250 m (820 ft)	49/49	
Queens Place	Melbourne	Australia	249 m (817 ft)	79/79	Tallest twin buildings in Oceania.
One9Five Asoke-Rama IX	Bangkok	Thailand	248 m (814 ft)	61/61	
Chengdu IFS Towers	Chengdu	China	247 m (810 ft)	50/50	
Aykon City	Dubai	United Arab Emirates	246 m (807 ft)	63/63	
The Vogue Suites	Kuala Lumpur	Malaysia	243 m (797 ft)	63/63	
Futures Trading Plaza	Dalian	China	243 m (797 ft)	53/53	
Altair	Colombo	Sri Lanka	240 m (787 ft)	68/63	
Bahrain WTC	Manama	Bahrain	240 m (787 ft)	50/50	
Harbour Plaza	Toronto	Canada	237 m (778 ft)	67/63	Tallest twin residential buildings in Canada.
Space Residency	Johor Bahru	Malaysia	230 m (755 ft)	61/61	
Deutsche Bank Center	New York City	United States	229 m (751 ft)	55/55	Tallest twin buildings in the United States.
One Shangri-La Place Twin Towers	Mandaluyong	Philippines	227 m (745 ft)	64/64	Tallest twin buildings in the Philippines.
North Point	Pattaya	Thailand	226 m (741 ft)	57/46	
Parque Central Complex	Caracas	Venezuela	225 m (738 ft)	56/56	Tallest building(s) in Venezuela.
BSA Twin Towers	Mandaluyong	Philippines	221 m (725 ft)	55/55	
The Journal	Jersey City	United States	220 m (722 ft)	72/72	
Tianfu IFC Towers	Chengdu	China	220 m (722 ft)	58/58	
Ziraat Towers	Istanbul	Turkey	219 m (719 ft)	46/40	
The Peak Twin Towers	Jakarta	Indonesia	218 m (715 ft)	55/55	
CITIC Pacific HQ & Mandarin Oriental	Shanghai	China	218 m (715 ft)	49/49	
Sheraton International Business Center	Chongqing	China	218 m (715 ft)	42/42	
Arte Cheras	Kuala Lumpur	Malaysia	215.9 m (708 ft)	41/41	
Naza Towers	Kuala Lumpur	Malaysia	215.5 m (707 ft)	50/38	
Tri Tower Residences	Johor Bahru	Malaysia	215 m (705 ft)	54/54	
City National Plaza	Los Angeles	United States	213.1 m (699 ft)	52/52	
Keangnam Hanoi Landmark Tower	Hanoi	Vietnam	213 m (699 ft)	48/48	Tallest twin buildings in Vietnam.
The St. Francis Shangri-La Place	Mandaluyong	Philippines	212.88 m (698 ft)	60/60	
Katara Towers	Lusail	Qatar	211 m (692 ft)	40/40	
The Sentral Residences	Kuala Lumpur	Malaysia	210 m (689 ft)	58/58	
Orchid Enclave	Mumbai	India	210 m (689 ft)	54/54	
Emerald Towers	Astana	Kazakhstan	210 m (689 ft)	53/37	Tallest twin buildings in Kazakhstan.
Halkbank Headquarters	Istanbul	Turkey	208 m (682 ft)	46/32	
Muze @ PICC	George Town	Malaysia	205.5 m (674 ft)	52/58	Tallest twin buildings in Penang.
Olaya Towers	Riyadh	Saudi Arabia	203.4 m (667 ft)	34/36	
Berjaya Times Square	Kuala Lumpur	Malaysia	203 m (666 ft)	48/48	
Le Nouvel Towers	Kuala Lumpur	Malaysia	200 m (656 ft)	49/49	
M1 & M2	Mississauga	Canada	200 m (656 ft)	62/62	Tallest building(s) in Mississauga.
Bankers Hall	Calgary	Canada	197 m (646 ft)	52/52	Tallest twin office buildings in Canada.
Anthill Residence Towers	Istanbul	Turkey	195 m (640 ft)	54/54	
The Tokyo Towers	Tokyo	Japan	194 m (636 ft)	58/58	Tallest twin buildings in Japan.
Vakıfbank Headquarters	Istanbul	Turkey	194 m (636 ft)	43/37	
Jesselton Twin Towers	Kota Kinabalu	Malaysia	192.1 m (630 ft)	56/56	Tallest building(s) in Borneo.
One Galaxy	Surabaya	Indonesia	192 m (630 ft)	50/50	
Silverscape Residences	Malacca City	Malaysia	190.1 m (624 ft)	49/49	
Cyber World Tower	Bangkok	Thailand	190 m (623 ft)	51/46	
Setia V Residences	George Town	Malaysia	189 m (620 ft)	48/38	
Zire Wongamat	Pattaya	Thailand	188 m (617 ft)	54/37	
Arte S	George Town	Malaysia	186 m (610 ft)	51/41	
Lippo Centre	Hong Kong	China	186 m (610 ft)	44/48	
Saman Faraz	Tehran	Iran	185 m (607 ft)	50/50	Tallest twin buildings in Iran.
Oberoi Esquire Towers	Mumbai	India	181 m (594 ft)	53/53/53	
Maestria Condominiums	Montreal	Canada	200 m (656 ft)	61/58	Highest residential tower in Montreal and the largest mixed-use residential project in Quebec
Immigration Tower and Revenue Tower	Hong Kong	China	181 m (594 ft)	49/49	
Panhsin Twin Towers	New Taipei	Taiwan	180 m (591 ft)	34/32	
Jordan Gate Towers	Amman	Jordan	180 m (591 ft)	44/44	Tallest twin buildings in Jordan.
Absolute World	Mississauga	Canada	179.5 m (589 ft)	56/50	
Marina City	Chicago	United States	179 m (587 ft)	65/65	Were both the tallest residential and tallest concrete structures in the world upon completion in 1968.
Pacific Plaza Towers	Taguig	Philippines	179 m (587 ft)	49/49	
Pacific Village Towers	Panama City	Panama	179 m (587 ft)	47/47	Tallest twin buildings in Panama.
New Administrative Capital Building (D02 and D03)	New Administrative Capital	Egypt	176 m (577 ft)	45/45	Tallest twin buildings in Africa.
Lyfe Towers	Bnei Brak	Israel	174.9 m (574 ft)	42/37	
Tours Mercuriales (Tower 2)	Paris	France	175 m (574 ft)	33/33	
Century Plaza Towers	Century City	United States	174 m (571 ft)	44/44	
Concourse V & VI	Sandy Springs	United States	173.7 m (570 ft)	34/34	
Commerce Square	Philadelphia	United States	172 m (564 ft)	41/41	
Renoir towers	Buenos Aires	Argentina	171.2 m (562 ft)	41/50	Tallest twin buildings in Argentina.
Bosque Real Residences	Huixquilucan	Mexico	170.1 m (558 ft)	42/42	Tallest twin buildings in Mexico.
Trilogy Limassol Seafront	Limassol	Cyprus	170 m (558 ft)	39/35	Tallest twin buildings in Cyprus.
The Gate Towers	New Alamein	Egypt	170 m (558 ft)	44/44	
Blue and Green Diamond	Miami Beach	United States	170 m (558 ft)	44/44	
Jeju Dream Tower	Jeju	South Korea	169 m (554 ft)	38/38	Tallest twin buildings in South Korea.
Ashton Asok-Rama 9	Bangkok	Thailand	168 m (551 ft)	49/45	
Miramar Towers	Panama City	Panama	168 m (551 ft)	55/55	
Tekstilkent Plaza	Istanbul	Turkey	168 m (551 ft)	44/44	
Trump Palace and Trump Royale	Sunny Isles Beach	United States	168 m (551 ft)	43/43	
Jade Beach and Jade Ocean	Sunny Isles Beach	United States	167 m (548 ft)	52/51	
Park Chidlom	Bangkok	Thailand	167 m (548 ft)	35/28	
Tours Société Générale	Paris	France	167 m (548 ft)	37/37	
Mystic Point Panama	Panama City	Panama	166 m (545 ft)	44/44	
The Maritime	George Town	Malaysia	166 m (545 ft)	42/42	
Sevilla Towers	Panama City	Panama	165 m (541 ft)	49/49	
Selenium Twins	Istanbul	Turkey	165 m (541 ft)	34/34	
GA Twin Towers	Mandaluyong	Philippines	165 m (541 ft)	30/30	
Murghab Twin Tower	Kuwait City	Kuwait	165 m (541 ft)	40/40	Tallest twin buildings in Kuwait.
Far Eastern Plaza	Taipei	Taiwan	164 m (538 ft)	41/41	
Villa Serena Home Club	Balneário Camboriú	Brazil	164 m (538 ft)	46/46	
Mulieris Towers	Buenos Aires	Argentina	164 m (538 ft)	46/46	
Alon Towers	Tel Aviv	Israel	161.7 m (531 ft)	42/42	
The Latitude	George Town	Malaysia	161 m (528 ft)	43/43	
Sunland 41	New Taipei	Taiwan	160.8 m (528 ft)	41/41	
Orbi City	Batumi	Georgia	160 m (525 ft)	55/55	
3 Residence	George Town	Malaysia	160 m (525 ft)	47/47	
New Administrative Capital Building (C11 and C12)	New Administrative Capital	Egypt	160 m (525 ft)	27/27	
Yihwa International Complex	Taipei	Taiwan	160 m (525 ft)	45/45	
El Faro Towers	Buenos Aires	Argentina	160 m (525 ft)	46/46	
Sky Towers	Kyiv	Ukraine	160 m (525 ft)	42/32	Tallest twin buildings in Ukraine.
HaArba'a Towers	Tel Aviv-Yafa	Israel	160 m (525 ft)	38/34	
Long-Bang Trade Plaza	Taichung	Taiwan	160 m (525 ft)	37/37	
New Administrative Capital Building (C07 and C08)	New Administrative Capital	Egypt	159.9 m (525 ft)	32/32	
Roppongi Hills Residences B and C	Tokyo	Japan	159 m (522 ft)	43/43	
Sabanci Center	Istanbul	Turkey	158 m (518 ft)	39/34	
He-huan Landmark	New Taipei	Taiwan	157 m (515 ft)	42/42	
Chapter Charoen Nakhon	Bangkok	Thailand	157 m (514 ft)	46/43	
Niche Mono Ramkhamhaeng	Bangkok	Thailand	157 m (515 ft)	37/33	
Da Vinci Towers	Tel Aviv	Israel	155.2 m (509 ft)	42/42	
Gurney Paragon	George Town	Malaysia	155 m (509 ft)	43/43	
Deutsche Bank Twin Towers	Frankfurt	Germany	155 m (509 ft)	40/38	Tallest twin buildings in Germany.
Circle Condominium	Bangkok	Thailand	155 m (507 ft)	43/30	
333 Riverside	Bangkok	Thailand	155 m (507 ft)	42/41	
Residences of College Park	Toronto	Canada	155 m (509 ft)	51/45	
Hudson Greene	Jersey City	United States	155 m (509 ft)	48/48	Tallest twin buildings in New Jersey
Jaff Towers	Sulaymaniyah	Iraq	155 m (509 ft)	32/32	Tallest twin buildings in Iraq.
City Residence	George Town	Malaysia	154 m (505 ft)	39/39	
PSPF Towers	Dar es Salaam	Tanzania	152.7 m (501 ft)	35/35	Tallest twin buildings in Tanzania.
WTC Colombo	Colombo	Sri Lanka	152 m (499 ft)	40/40	Tallest twin buildings in Sri Lanka.
Lulu IT Twin Towers	Kochi	India	152 m (499 ft)	30/30	Tallest twin buildings in South India.
The Modern	Fort Lee	United States	151 metres (495 ft)	47/47	
Salcedo Park Twin Towers	Makati	Philippines	151 m (495 ft)	45/45	
Dolmen City	Karachi	Pakistan	151 m (495 ft)	40/40	Tallest twin buildings in Pakistan.
BTS Visionary Park	Bangkok	Thailand	150 m (495 ft)	36/36	
Highwealth - City of Leadership	Kaohsiung	Taiwan	150 m (492 ft)	38/38	
Tours Mercuriales (Tower 2)	Paris	France	150 m (492 ft)	33/33	
Centre Square	Philadelphia	United States	150 m (492 ft)	40/32	
The Columns at Legazpi Village	Makati	Philippines	150 m (492 ft)	41/41	
World Trade Center, Mumbai	Mumbai	India	150 m (492 ft)	30/26	
Torres del Poeta	La Paz	Bolivia	150 m (492 ft)	36/34	Tallest twin buildings in Bolivia.
The Residences at the Ritz Carlton, Westchester	White Plains	United States	147.5 m (484 ft)	44/44	
Roccabella	Montreal	Canada	147 m (482 ft)	40/40	
JuBi Building	The Hague	Netherlands	146 m (479 ft)	37/37	The buildings share one base of 10 storeys. Half is clad with red bricks, the other with white bricks. Headquarters of the Ministry of Justice and Ministry of the Interior.
First World Hotel	Genting Highlands	Malaysia	144.6 m (474 ft)	37/37	
Cantavil Premier	Ho Chi Minh City	Vietnam	144 m (472 ft)	36/36	
TAT Twin Towers	Istanbul	Turkey	143 m (469 ft)	42/32	
Koryo Hotel	Pyongyang	North Korea	143 m (469 ft)	40/40	Tallest twin buildings in North Korea.
Uphill Court	Istanbul	Turkey	143 m (469 ft)	42/32	
Metrocity Millennium 2,3	Istanbul	Turkey	143 m (469 ft)	35/35	
Kaohsiung Twin Towers	Kaohsiung	Taiwan	142 m (466 ft)	35/35	
Mirabilia Towers	Buenos Aires	Argentina	142 m (466 ft)	46/45	
Empire Tower	Colombo	Sri Lanka	142 m (466 ft)	37/35	
Nile City Towers	Cairo	Egypt	142 m (466 ft)	34/34	
Ocean Park Towers	Panama City	Panama	141 m (463 ft)	44/44	
Yacht Towers	Buenos Aires	Argentina	140.8 m (462 ft)	44/44	
Alto Palermo Towers	Buenos Aires	Argentina	140 m (459 ft)	35/35	
TOBB Towers	Ankara	Turkey	140 m (459 ft)	34/34	
One Park Taipei	Taipei	Taiwan	139.5 m (458 ft)	35/31	
Ruentex Nangang Station Complex	Taipei	Taiwan	138.3 m (454 ft)	30/30	
801 South Street	Honolulu	United States	137.2 m (450 ft)	46/46	Tallest twin buildings in Hawaii.
Veer Towers	Las Vegas	United States	137 m (449 ft)	37/37	Tallest twin inclined buildings in the world.
Dolfines Guaraní	Rosario	Argentina	136.5 m (448 ft)	42/42	
Saigon Pearl	Ho Chi Minh City	Vietnam	136 m (446 ft)	38/38	
Grand Forever	Taichung	Taiwan	135 m (443 ft)	35/35	
GS Towers	Colombo	Sri Lanka	135 m (443 ft)	36/36	
Torres del Yacht	Buenos Aires	Argentina	135 m (443 ft)	45/45	
Insignia Towers	Seattle	United States	134 m (440 ft)	41/41	
Belgacom Towers	Brussels	Belgium	134 m (440 ft)	28/28	Tallest twin buildings in Belgium.
Gurney Park	George Town	Malaysia	133 m (436 ft)	40/40	
Skyland Landmark	New Taipei	Taiwan	133 m (436 ft)	36/36	
Şişli TAT Center	Istanbul	Turkey	130 m (427 ft)	26/26	
Moana Pacific Towers	Honolulu	United States	128.5 m (422 ft)	46/46	Tallest twin buildings in Hawaii.
Residencial del Bosque 1	Mexico City	Mexico	128 m (420 ft)	30/30	
Kempinski Residences Astoria	Istanbul	Turkey	127 m (417 ft)	27/27	
Highlight Towers	Munich	Germany	126 m (413 ft)	32/27	
Norra tornen	Stockholm	Sweden	125 m (410 ft)	36/33	
Imperio Residence	Malacca City	Malaysia	123.8 m (406 ft)	32/32	
Zunda Towers	Riga	Latvia	123 m (404 ft)	31/30	Tallest twin buildings in Latvia.
Enel Towers	Naples	Italy	122 m (400 ft)	33/33	Tallest twin buildings in Italy.
Harbor Towers	Boston	United States	121 m (400 ft)	40/40	
Swiss Belhotel Kuantan & Imperium Residence	Kuantan	Malaysia	120 m (394 ft)	28/28	
Alem Plaza and Catalinas Plaza	Buenos Aires	Argentina	120 m (394 ft)	32/29	
Royal Park Towers	Kotte	Sri Lanka	120 m (394 ft)	25/25	
Torres de Santa Cruz	Santa Cruz de Tenerife	Spain	120 m (394 ft)	35/35	Tallest twin buildings in Spain.
Hung Vuong Plaza	Ho Chi Minh City	Vietnam	120 m (394 ft)	29/29	
Sky City Tower	Hanoi	Vietnam	120 m (394 ft)	31/31	
Bulnes and Ruggieri towers	Buenos Aires	Argentina	120 m (394 ft)	37/37	
Bosmal City Center	Sarajevo	Bosnia and Herzegovina	118 m (387 ft)	34/34	Tallest twin buildings in Bosnia and Herzegovina.
Saverio and Francesco Towers	Naples	Italy	118 m (387 ft)	34/34	
İşbank Tower 2,3	Istanbul	Turkey	118 m (387 ft)	36/36	
Swissôtel Tallinn	Tallinn	Estonia	117 m (384 ft)	31/28	Tallest twin buildings in Estonia.
Rosslyn Twin Towers	Arlington	United States	116 m (381 ft)	31/31	
Iceland Residencies	Colombo	Sri Lanka	116 m (381 ft)	31/31	
Liberty Towers	Jersey City	United States	116 m (381 ft)	38/36	
Oficinas en el Parque Torre 2	Monterrey	Mexico	115 m (377 ft)	28/24	
Vincom Center	Ho Chi Minh City	Vietnam	115 m (377 ft)	28/28	
Casablanca Twin Center	Casablanca	Morocco	115 m (377 ft)	28/28	Tallest twin buildings in Morocco.
Gate of Europe	Madrid	Spain	115 m (377 ft)	26/26	
Gemelos 26	Benidorm	Spain	114 m (374 ft)	33/33	
Torres d'Oboe	Benidorm	Spain	114 m (374 ft)	31/31	
Saint Gabriel and Saint Raphael Towers	Lisbon	Portugal	110 m (361 ft)	32/32	Tallest twin buildings in Portugal.
The Centaurus Residential Towers	Islamabad	Pakistan	110 m (361 ft)	32/32	
Ocean Club	Atlantic City	United States	110 m (360 ft)	34/34	
Denver World Trade Center	Denver	United States	109 m (358 ft)	28/29	
Port of Spain International Waterfront Centre	Port of Spain	Trinidad and Tobago	108.8 m (357 ft)	27/27	Tallest twin buildings in Trinidad and Tobago.
Sky Office Tower	Zagreb	Croatia	108 m (354 ft)	22/22	Tallest twin buildings in Croatia.
City Center	White Plains	United States	108 m (354 ft)	35/35	Officially known as One City Place (North Tower) and Trump Tower at City Center (South Tower)
Plaza San Marco and Plaza Bucale towers	Buenos Aires	Argentina	107 m (351 ft)	36/34	
Caballito Nuevo I-II	Buenos Aires	Argentina	106 m (348 ft)	35/35	
Tashkent City Mall Hotel and Residential Tower	Tashkent	Uzbekistan	105.7 m (347 ft)	30/29	Tallest twin buildings in Uzbekistan.
Rabobank Bestuurscentrum	Utrecht	Netherlands	105 m (344 ft)	27/27	
Formosa Twin Towers	Taipei	Taiwan	104.97 m (344 ft)	30/30	
Juan Felipe Ibarra Complex	Santiago del Estero	Argentina	104.5 m (343 ft)	25/18	
Residencial Islamar (Towers II and III)	Benidorm	Spain	104 m (341 ft)	31/31	
Centro Simón Bolívar	Caracas	Venezuela	103 m (338 ft)	25/25	
Ren Cen Towers 500 and 600	Detroit	United States	103 m (338 ft)	21/21	
De Hoge Heren	Rotterdam	Netherlands	102 m (335 ft)	34/34	
Queen's Wharf Tower 2 and 3	Brisbane	Australia	101 m (331 ft)	26/26	Tallest twin buildings in Oceania.
Las Terrazas de Benidorm	Benidorm	Spain	101 m (331 ft)	30/30	
Residensi PR1MA Kampung Paloh A & B	Ipoh	Malaysia	100.9 m (331 ft)	31/31	Tallest twin buildings in the state of Perak, Malaysia.
Gemelos 22	Benidorm	Spain	100 m (328 ft)	33/33	
Canning Towers	Buenos Aires	Argentina	100 m (328 ft)	31/31	
River View Towers	Buenos Aires	Argentina	100 m (328 ft)	31/31	
Torri Garibaldi	Milan	Italy	100 m (328 ft)	25/25	
Deneys Reitz	Sandton	South Africa	100 m (328 ft)	24/18	Tallest twin buildings in South Africa.
Torres de Manantiales	Mar del Plata	Argentina	100 m (328 ft)	29/29	
The Zenith Hotel & Menara Zenith	Kuantan	Malaysia	95 m (312 ft)	24/24	
Amansuri Residences	Alor Setar	Malaysia	92.9 m (305 ft)	23/24	

=== Under construction ===
Name	City	Country	Height (max.)	Floors (T1/T2)	Notes
The Line	Neom	Saudi Arabia	500 m (1,640 ft)	?/?	To be the tallest twin buildings in the world.
Taipei Twin Towers	Taipei	Taiwan	369 m (1,211 ft)	74/55	To be the tallest twin buildings in Taiwan.
Gateway Towers	Gandhinagar	India	362 m (1,188 ft)	27/27	
Rustomjee Crown	Mumbai	India	337 m (1,106 ft)	75/75/75	
Aaradhya Avaan	Mumbai	India	307 m (1,007 ft)	80/77	
Indonesia One Towers	Jakarta	Indonesia	303 m (994 ft)	64/60	To be the tallest twin buildings in Indonesia
India Bulls Sky Forest Tower	Mumbai	India	276 m (906 ft)	80/60	
Jolshiri Twin Towers	Dhaka	Bangladesh	270 m (890 ft)	65/65	
Bhoomi Celestia	Mumbai	India	250 m (820 ft)	40/40	
Shang Summit	Quezon City	Philippines	250 m (820 ft)	80/80	To be the tallest twin buildings in the Philippines.
Spirit of Saigon	Ho Chi Minh City	Vietnam	240 m (787 ft)	55/48	To be the tallest twin buildings in Vietnam.
Shibaura 1-Chome Rebuilding Project	Tokyo	Japan	230 m (750 ft)	43/42	
Tianjin Goldin Finance Center Twin Towers	Tianjin	China	223 m (732 ft)	43/43	
Vien Dong Meridian	Da Nang	Vietnam	220 m (722 ft)	48/48	
One Journal Square	Jersey City	United States	216.5 m (710 ft)	64/64	To be second tallest twin buildings in the United States.
Gold Tower 47	Phnom Penh	Cambodia	211 m (692 ft)	47/47	
Parklinks Towers	Quezon City	Philippines	193 m (633 ft)	55/55	
Xinyanzhao Fortune Center	Shijiazhuang	China	186.8 m (613 ft)	46/46	
Nua Interlomas	Huixquilucan	Mexico	180 m (591 ft)	47/47	To be the tallest twin buildings in Mexico.
Vauxhall Square	London	United Kingdom	168 m (551 ft)	49/49	
The Destiny Mall & Residency	Colombo	Sri Lanka	160 m (525 ft)	44/44	
Ocean View Residences	Colombo	Sri Lanka	152 m (499 ft)	47/47	

=== Approved ===
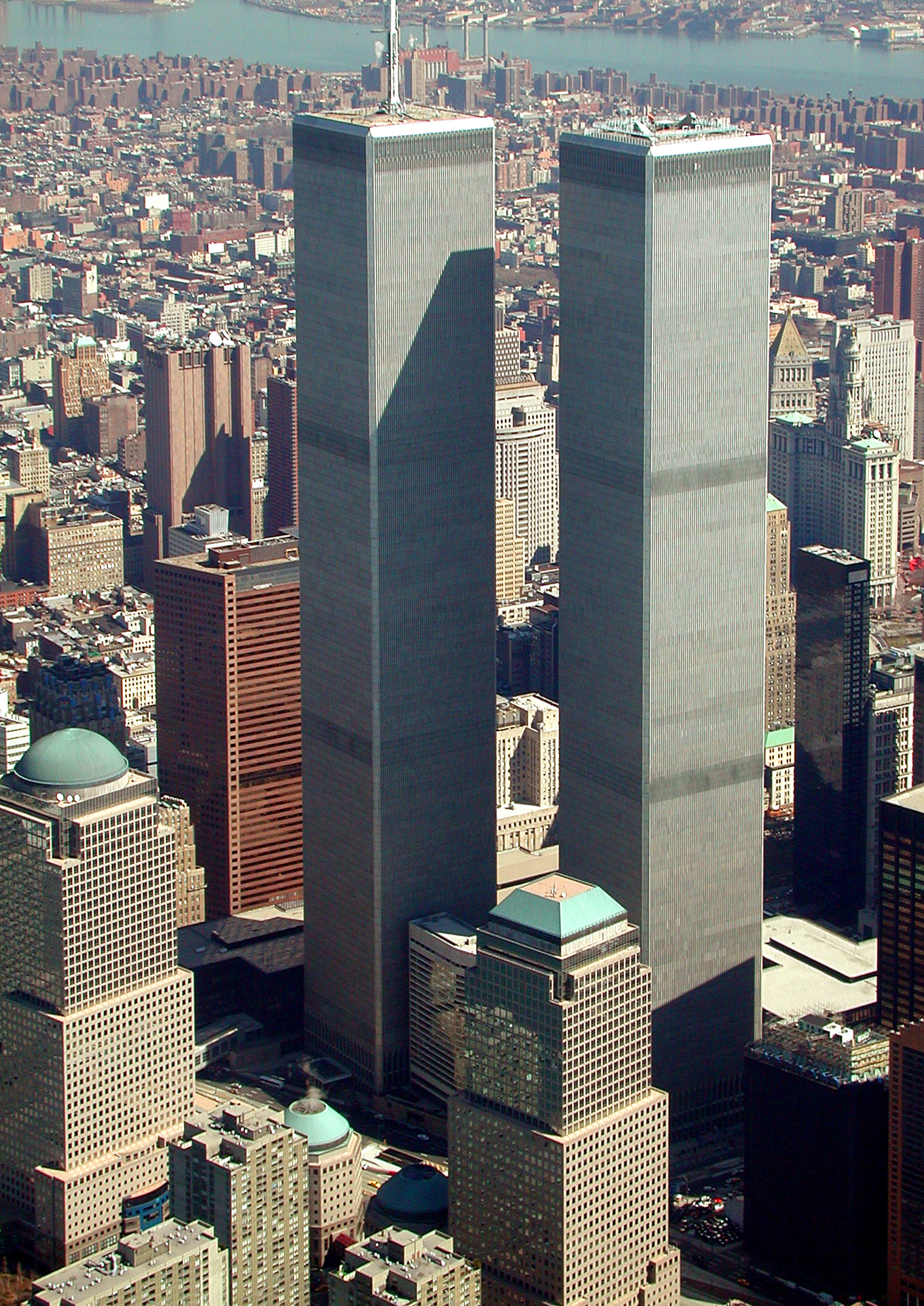
The original World Trade Center in New York City pictured in March 2001, six months before they were destroyed.

Name	City	Country	Height (max.)	Floors (T1/T2)	Status	Notes
Hanoi Twin Towers 99	Hanoi	Vietnam	569 m (1,867 ft)	99/99	Approved	To be the tallest twin buildings in the world.
Sky Link	Mumbai	India	301 m (988 ft)	85/85	Approved	
Djibouti Towers	Djibouti City	Djibouti	243 m (797 ft)	43/43	Approved	To be the tallest twin buildings in Africa.

=== Destroyed or cancelled ===
Name	City	Country	Height (max.)	Floors (T1/T2)	Status	Notes
151 Incheon Tower	Incheon	South Korea	613 m (2,011 ft)	151/151	Cancelled	Would have been the tallest twin buildings in the world.
Twin Towers II	New York City	United States	450 m (1,476 ft)	115/115	Cancelled	Would have been the tallest twin buildings in the Western Hemisphere.
World Trade Center	New York City	United States	417 m (1,368 ft)	110/110	Destroyed	Destroyed in the September 11 attacks. Former Tallest building in the world, 1971–1973 and former Tallest twin buildings in the world, 1971–1996. Tallest occupied buildings to be destroyed.
Al Mada Towers	Jeddah	Saudi Arabia	358 m (1,175 ft)	86/86	Cancelled	Would have been the tallest twin buildings in Saudi Arabia.
Torre Planetarium	Panama City	Panama	343 m (1,125 ft)	92/82	Cancelled	Would have been the tallest twin buildings in Latin America.
Hermitage Towers	Paris	France	320 m (1,050 ft)	86/85	Cancelled	Would have been the tallest twin buildings in Europe.
Vida Za'abeel	Dubai	United Arab Emirates	301.5 m (989 ft)	78/69	Cancelled	To be the tallest twin buildings in the Zabeel Park.
Broadway Corridor Twin Towers	Portland	United States	296 m (971 ft)	??/??	Cancelled	Would have been the tallest twin buildings in the West Coast of the United States.
Sanaya Amman	Amman	Jordan	206 m (676 ft)	50/50	Cancelled	Would have been the tallest building(s) in Jordan.
Accra Twin Towers	Accra	Ghana	160 m (525 ft)	40/40	Cancelled	Would have been the tallest building(s) in Ghana.
SWDG Condominiums	Phoenix	United States	152 m (499 ft)	44/44	Cancelled	Would have been the tallest building(s) in Arizona.
James Monroe Building	Richmond	United States	137 m (449 ft)	29	Partially built	Originally proposed as a pair of buildings, but only one was built.

== Buildings and structures with more than two identical columns ==
Name	City	Country	Height (max.)	No. of columns	Floors (max./min.)	Status	Ref
Haeundae LCT The Sharp	Busan	South Korea	411.6 m (1,350 ft)	3	101/85/85	Completed	
The One	Colombo	Sri Lanka	376 m (1,234 ft)	3	92/80/77	On hold	
Sobha Central	Dubai	United Arab Emirates	369 m (1,211 ft)	6	99/84/76/71/66/61	Proposed	
Rustomjee Crown	Mumbai	India	337 m (1,106 ft)	3	75/75	Under construction	
Address Fountain Views	Dubai	United Arab Emirates	331 m (1,086 ft)	3	77/71/71	Completed	
Lusail Plaza Towers	Lusail	Qatar	310 m (1,017 ft)	4	70/70/40/40	Completed	
Capital Towers	Moscow	Russia	295 m (968 ft)	3	67/68/67	Completed	
Vietnam Financial Centre	Ho Chi Minh City	Vietnam	285 m (935 ft)	5	48/48	Proposed	
Riverside Crescent	Dubai	United Arab Emirates	263 m (863 ft)	6	73/73/65/65/57/57	Under construction	
Sorrento	Hong Kong	China	256 m (840 ft)	5	81/73/71/69/67	Completed	
The Sail	Malacca City	Malaysia	255 m (837 ft)	9	61/61/61/61/61/61/61/61/61	Proposed	
Grand Ion Majestic	Grand Ion City	Malaysia	253 m (830 ft)	3	50/45/50	Topped-out	
Binghatti Skyrise	Dubai	United Arab Emirates	250 m (820 ft)	3	57/57/57	Under construction	
Nile Business City Tower	New Administrative Capital	Egypt	233 m (764 ft)	4	56/56/56/56	Under construction	
The Belcher's	Hong Kong	China	227 m (745 ft)	6	63/63/63/63/63/61	Completed	
Millennium Residence	Bangkok	Thailand	199 m (654 ft)	4	51/53/53/51	Completed	
CityPlex Towers	Tulsa	United States	197.5 m (648 ft)	3	60/30/20	Completed	
Marina Bay Sands	Singapore	Singapore	195 m (640 ft)	3	55/55/55	Completed	
Sunway Belfield	Kuala Lumpur	Malaysia	190 m (623 ft)	3	48/48/48	Under construction	
Neo Sky Dome	New Taipei	Taiwan	188 m (617 ft)	4	46/43/43/40	Completed	
Park 24	Bangkok	Thailand	186 m (611 ft)	5	51/50/41/30/29	Completed	
Flame Towers	Baku	Azerbaijan	182 m (597 ft)	3	33/30/28	Completed	
Empire State Plaza	Albany	United States	180 m (591 ft)	5	44/23/23/23/23	Completed	
Arte Mont Kiara @ KL Metropolis	Kuala Lumpur	Malaysia	175 m (574 ft)	3	35/52/36	Completed	
The Tenz Alor Setar	Alor Setar	Malaysia	171.9 m (564 ft)	4	40/29/19/11	Proposed	
Skyrise Avenue	Bangkok	Thailand	169 m (554 ft)	4	49/48/48/46	Completed	
Farglory U-Town	New Taipei	Taiwan	166 m (545 ft)	4	39/37/35/35	Completed	
Ren Cen Towers 100, 200, 300 and 400	Detroit	United States	159 m (522 ft)	4	39/39/39/39	Completed	
The Bridge	Phnom Penh	Cambodia	154 m (505 ft)	4	45/45/45/45	Completed	
The Saint Residences	Bangkok	Thailand	151 m (495 ft)	3	41/41/41	Completed	
Belle Grand Rama 9	Bangkok	Thailand	150 m (495 ft)	8	43/43/36/36/34/34/27/27	Completed	
Bridge Upto Zenith	New Taipei	Taiwan	146 m (479 ft)	4	37/35/33/31	Completed	
Le Parc Puerto Madero	Buenos Aires	Argentina	144 m (472 ft)	3	43/43/43	Completed	
Park Gate Residence (Wasl1)	Dubai	United Arab Emirates		4	55/50/40/31	Completed	
Taipei Sky Dome	New Taipei	Taiwan	142 m (466 ft)	5	37/37/37/37/37	Completed	
Presidential Towers	Chicago	United States	141 metres (463 ft)	4	49/49/49/49	Completed	
Taipei No.1	New Taipei	Taiwan	140 m (459 ft)	3	37/36/36	Completed	
Keells OnThree20	Colombo	Sri Lanka		3	37/37/37	Under construction	
Diamond Towers	Taipei	Taiwan	134 m (440 ft)	3	31/30/30	Completed	
Cevahir Towers	Skopje	North Macedonia	130 m (427 ft)	4	40/40/40/40	Completed	
Malecon Center	Santo Domingo	Dominican Republic	122 m (400 ft)	3	31/31	Completed	
Obsidier Tower	New Administrative Capital	Egypt	115 m (377 ft)	3	29/27/25	Under construction	
The Centaurus	Islamabad	Pakistan	110 m (361 ft)	3	32/32	Completed	
Abraj Al Lulu	Seef	Bahrain		3	50/40	Completed	
Havelock City Project	Colombo	Sri Lanka		9	29/29/27/27/22/22/22/22/19	Phase 1 complete, other phases Under construction	
Mezza Residences	Quezon City	Philippines	124.75 m (409.284777 ft)	4	38/38/38/38	Completed	
GEO Bukit Rimau Condominium	Shah Alam	Malaysia	110 m (361 ft)	3	34/34/34	Completed	
Melodi Perdana Apartment	Puncak Alam	Malaysia	88.1 m (289 ft) – Tower C & D / 104.1 m (342 ft) – Tower A & B	4	17/17/21/21	Topped-out	
Harmoni Elmina 1 A, B & C	Saujana Utama	Malaysia	100 m (328 ft) – Tower A & Tower B / 101 m (331 ft) – Tower C	3	19/19/20	Completed	

== List by continent ==
The following list shows the tallest completed twin buildings located in each continent:

Continent	Building	Height	Floor count	Completed	Country	City
Asia	Petronas Twin Towers	452 m (1,483 ft)	88/88	1996	Malaysia	Kuala Lumpur
Europe	City of Capitals	301 m (988 ft)	76/65	2009	Russia	Moscow
North America	One York and Harbour Plaza Residences	237 m (778 ft)	70/66	2017	Canada	Toronto
Oceania	Queens Place	249 m (817 ft)	79/79	2021	Australia	Brisbane
South America	Yachthouse Residence Club	295 m (968 ft)	81/81	2019	Brazil	Balneário Camboriú
Africa	New Administrative Capital Building (D02 and D03)	176 m (577 ft)	45/45	2024	Egypt	New Administrative Capital
Antarctica	Long Duration Balloon (LDB) Payload Preparation Buildings	15 m (49 ft)	1/1	2005	Antarctica	McMurdo Station

== See also ==
- List of tallest buildings
- List of tallest structures

== Notes ==
- A. By pinnacle height (height to tip of antenna, in this case)
