= Daniel Kaven =

American artist and designer

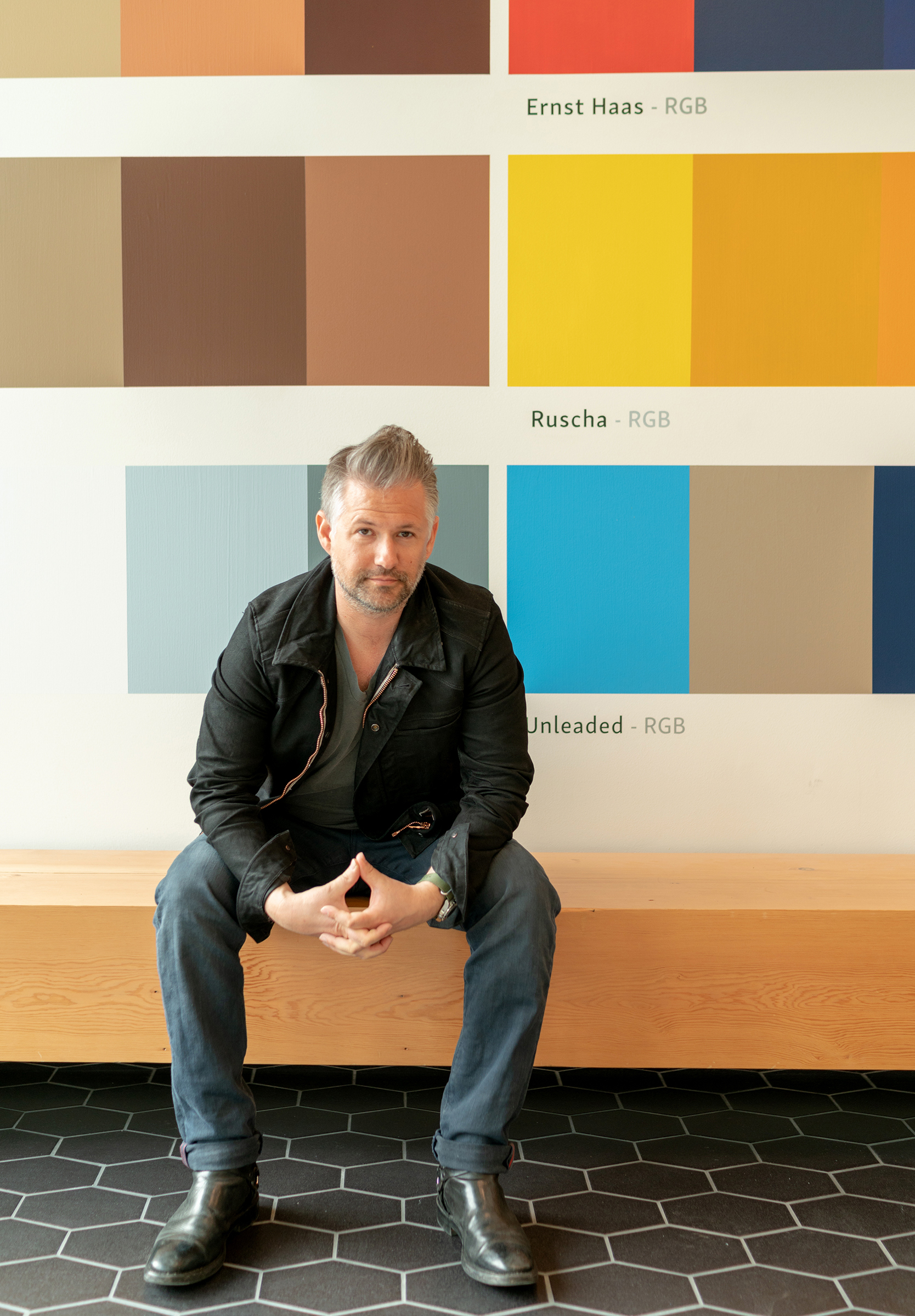
- Kaven, 2018
- Born: 1977 (age 48–49); Albuquerque, New Mexico
- Education: University of Oregon
- Notable work: Architecture of Normal (Birkhauser, 2022)
- Website: Co-founder of William Kaven Architecture

Daniel Kaven (born 1977 in Albuquerque, New Mexico) is an American architect and artist working in painting, film, writing, and photography. He is the co-founder of architecture and design studio William / Kaven Architecture and the author of Architecture of Normal: The Colonization of the American Landscape (Birkhäuser, 2022).

== Work ==
Kaven's body of work ranges from architecture, photography, print media, films.

=== Architecture ===
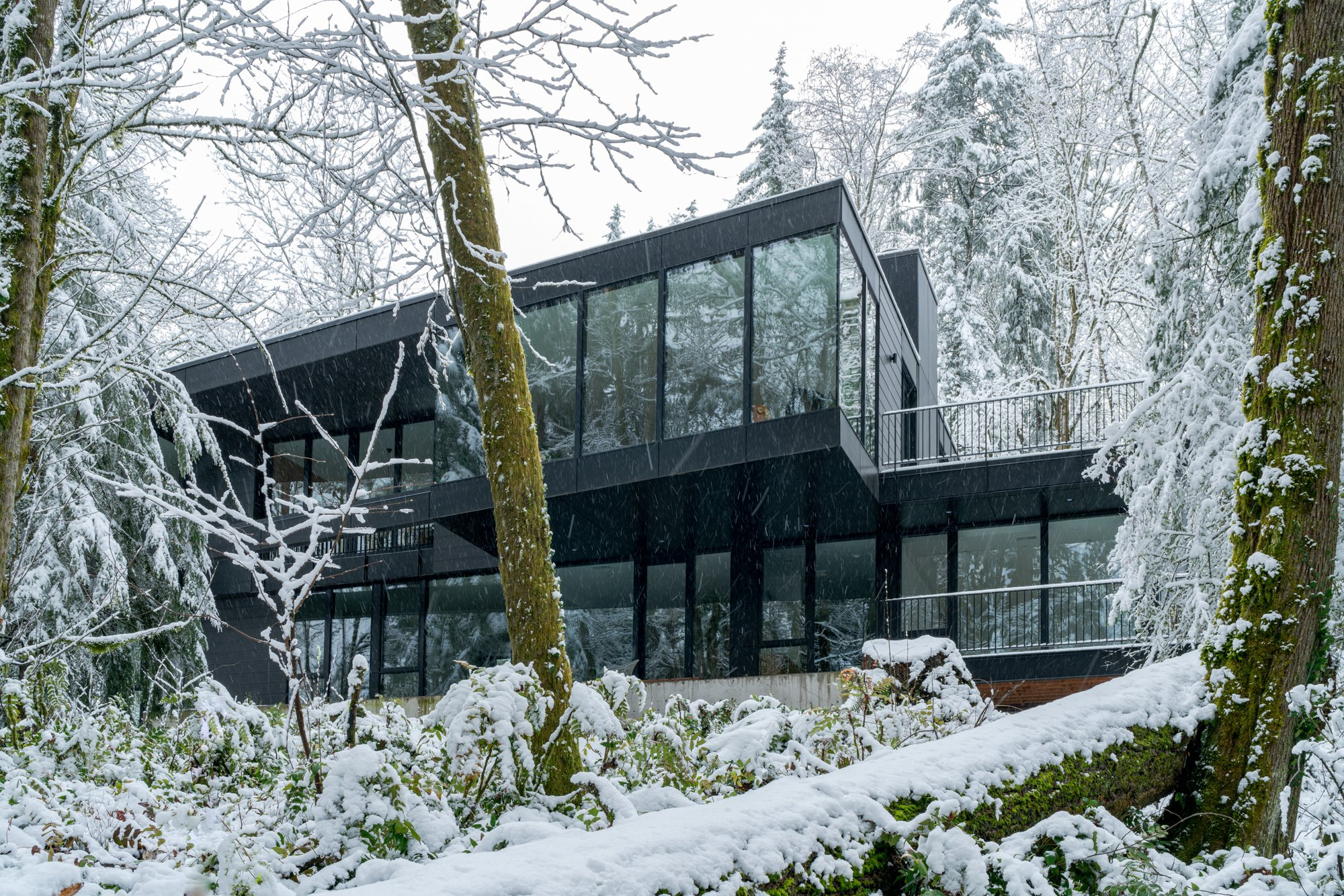
William Kaven Architecture's Royal Residence in Portland's Forest Park. Royal received a 2020 Architecture MasterPrize, a 2021 International Architecture Award and a 2021 American Architecture Award.

In 2004, Daniel Kaven and his brother Trevor William Lewis formed William Kaven Architecture, a design studio working in architecture and interiors. The project was written about in the Wall Street Journal, Dwell, Maxim, Hypebeast among others. In 2020, Royal received an Architecture MasterPrize. In 2021, the Chicago Athenaeum: Museum of Architecture and Design, together with the European Centre for Architecture Art Design and Urban Studies, awarded Royal both an International Architecture Award and an American Architecture Award.

The Heartwood Residence, built in 2021, was awarded a 2021 AIA Oregon Merit Award. Architectural Digest India called the project "contemporary, classic, and in constant conversation with the outdoors."

In 2020, William / Kaven completed work on Skyview, a private residence situated on a narrow lot in Northwest Portland's Alphabet District. Skyview won a 2021 Architecture MasterPrize Honorable Mention. The project was reviewed in The Wall Street Journal.

Camp MINOH, a private residence in Charlevoix, Michigan, was completed in 2018. The exterior of the structure is made of shou sugi ban and structural concrete. The project has been published in Architect Magazine, Dezeen and Gray Magazine, and received a 2019 AIA Michigan Honor Award. Of the design, the AIA Michigan jury said: "The restrained material palette, exposed structure and sense of craft."

In November 2017, Kaven proposed a design for the tallest building on the West Coast, dubbed the Portland Twin Towers by the press. The development project, designed to occupy the site of a soon-to-be-demolished United States Postal Service headquarters, would include two skyscrapers connected by a glass-enclosed botanical bridge 680 feet in the air.

In 2011, William / Kaven designed Interchange, a C-shaped private residence oriented around a central courtyard. The project was recognized by the American Institute of Architects (AIA) with a 2011 Merit Award. In 2013, The Wall Street Journal reviewed the work.

=== Writing ===
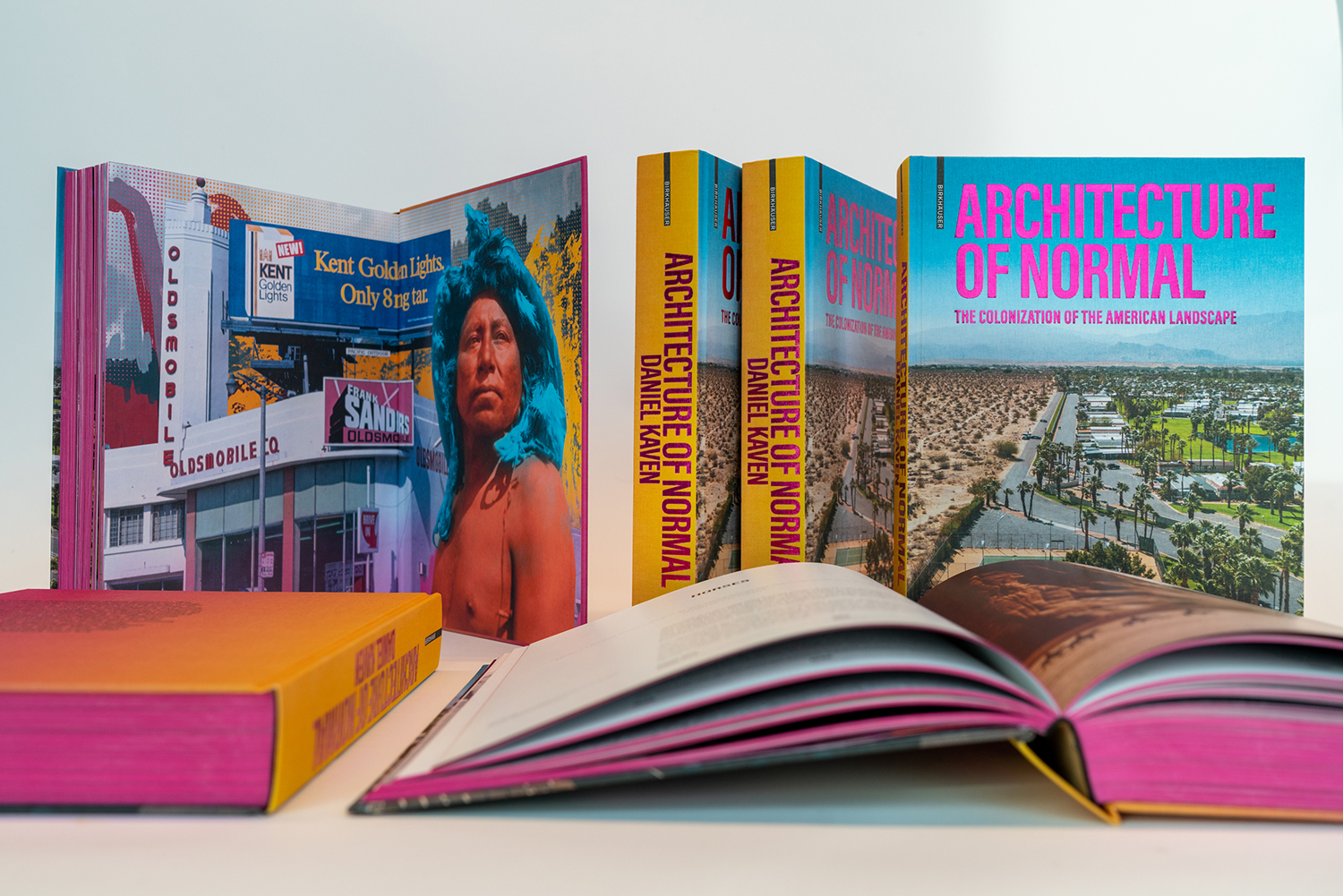
Architecture of Normal: The Colonization of the American Landscape by Daniel Kaven (Birkhäuser, 2022). Photo by Daniel Kaven.

Kaven's book Architecture of Normal (Birkhäuser, 2022) is a visual and literary exploration of how evolving forms of transportation have shaped the built environment of the American West since the arrival of the Spanish in New Mexico. The book includes historical photography as well as artwork by Kaven. In a review of the book, art critic Richard Speer says: "Kaven has crafted a thoroughly researched and well-reasoned treatise in which he argues that historical eras' dominant modes of transportation — walking on foot, riding horses, trains, cars, and airplanes — have inexorably influenced our public and private spaces." Germany's daily newspaper Frankfurter Allgemeine Zeitung calls the book an "instructive and aesthetically stunning collage."

=== Visual art ===
Kaven's visual art includes photographic media, film and painting. In 2005 he had a solo show at Gallery 500 in Portland, Oregon where he showed painted photographs exploring the emotional fallout of his parents' divorce. In 2000, Kaven directed and produced The Glass Pool Incident, a multi-channel documentary feature about the lives of youth across five continents on the last day of the millennium. The documentary was shown at the New York International Independent Film and Video Festival. Variety reviewed the film in a March 2003 issue. Kaven's narrative short film Naked Seoul screened in conjunction with an immersive installation of the same name at Gallery 500 in 2004. In a review of the work, art critic Richard Speer wrote, "It's a hypnotic short wherein each frame is immaculately composed and color-corrected. This is the kind of installation seldom seen and direly needed."

== Selected architectural works ==
- Royal (Portland, Oregon, 2019)
- Silica (Portland, Oregon, 2018)
- Broadway Corridor Master Plan (Portland, Oregon, unbuilt)
- Camp MINOH (Charlevoix, Michigan, 2017)
- Block 33 (Portland, Oregon, unbuilt)
- Elements (Mosier, Oregon, 2010)
- NAU (Salt Lake City, Utah)

== Selected awards ==
- 2021 American Architecture Award (Royal)
- 2021 International Architecture Award (Royal)
- 2020 Architecture MasterPrize (Royal)
- 2019 AIA Oregon Citation Award (Silica)
