= Vizient, Inc. =

American health care organization

Vizient Incorporated
- Type: Corporation
- Industry: Healthcare
- Founded: 2016
- Headquarters: Irving, Texas, United States
- Key people: Byron Jobe, President, CEO
- Website: vizient.com

Vizient Inc., based in Irving, Texas, is a corporation that serves over 5,000 not-for-profit health system members and their affiliates, including 1,360 acute care hospitals. Founded in 2016, it is a successor company to VHA, Inc., founded in 1977 as a network of not-for-profit health care organizations working in clinical, financial, and operational management. VHA and UHC (University HealthSystem Consortium) owned a supply chain company called Novation and aptitude(R), the industry's first online direct market for local contracting. VHA also owned Provista, the enterprise's supply chain company serving the non-acute market as well as government, education, and business sectors. There are over 4,000 employees across the enterprise.

VHA changed its name in 1994, adopting the initials of its former name (Voluntary Hospitals of America). The name change was to move beyond the outdated and often-misunderstood concepts of "voluntary" and "hospitals", while retaining its name recognition.

On April 1, 2015, VHA and UHC (University HealthSystem Consortium) merged to make one company, Vizient, making them the largest member-owned health care company in the nation. The combined organization officially aligned under the Vizient brand in 2016.
