= Two Towers (game) =

1975 board wargame based on The Lord of the Rings

- Publishers: Fantasy Game Company
- Publication: 1975
- Genres: Lord of the Rings

Two Towers is a board wargame published by Fantasy Game Company in 1975 that is based on The Lord of the Rings by J.R.R. Tolkien.

== Description ==
Two Towers is a 2-player wargame in which one player controls the forces of Good, and the other controls the forces of Evil. The setting is Middle-earth at the end of the Third Age.

The game is very simple — the rules take up less than two letter size pieces of paper — using a basic alternating turn system where one player moves and attacks, followed by the other player. Magic does not directly affect combat, but instead only shifts the column used on the Combat Results Table.

Each game lasts for about thirty turns. The Good player wins if the One Ring is destroyed in Mordor. The Evil player wins by preventing this before the end of the game.

== Publication history ==
Two Towers was published in 1975 by Fantasy Games Company and distributed by Lou Zocchi. The game disappeared, along with all other unlicensed games based on The Lord of the Rings, when in 1977, the Tolkien Estate issued cease & desist orders to all publishers of unlicensed games, forcing them to withdraw all Tolkien-based games from the market.

== Reception ==
In Issue 4 of The Space Gamer, Mark Leymaster called the map "neither aesthetic nor accurate", and thought the game rules displayed "no interesting new concepts or approaches, and only mundane efforts to simulate necessary effects." Leymaster concluded by characterizing this game as "excruciating simple-mindedness."

In the inaugural issue of Perfidious Albion, Charles Vasey noted that the map was full of oddities not explained in the rules, and decided that there were so many rules missing that "this whole game is not really a full simulation. It is a game with room for expansion." Vasey also pointed out that the victory conditions were focussed on destroying the One Ring in Mordor "so happenings in the Shire or Mirkwoood appear rather pointless." Vasey concluded that there was "scope for work" by the designers. Two issues later, Vasey wrote another review after fully play-testing the game. Vasey first discarded the game map, which he classified as "useless", and made his own map based on Tolkien's books. Even after that Vasey found many issues with the rules that would encourage unethical exploitation by both players. Vasey concluded by calling this game a "failure", stating, "there is little flavour of the books in this game ... [it] is in my opinion purely a novelty item, and rather a simplistic one at that. Also very long winded (about 30 turns) for little real purpose other than the thrills of killing Orcs and Evles and other strange things!!"
