= Broadway Corridor twin towers =

Proposed building complex in Portland, Oregon, U.S.

Broadway Corridor Twin Towers
- Rendering of the proposed complex (2017).
- Interactive map of the Broadway Corridor Twin Towers area

General information
- Status: Proposed
- Type: Office, hotel, residential and retail
- Architectural style: Neomodern
Other information
Location	Pearl District, Portland, Oregon, United States
Coordinates	45°31′45″N 122°40′45″W
Height
Height	296 m (971 ft)
Technical details
Floor count	95
Design and construction
Architecture firm	William/Kaven Architecture; Kaven + Co.

The Broadway Corridor twin towers complex (Note: The proposed building complex did not have an official name – it has been described as the "twin towers" or "Portland twin towers".) was a proposed mixed-use skyscraper complex in the Pearl District of Portland, Oregon. Multi-disciplinary architecture firm William Kaven Architecture proposed the complex as a potential part of the Broadway Corridor redevelopment project. The twin-towered skyscrapers would reach 970 feet (300 m) in height and would have become the tallest building in Oregon, the tallest twin towers in the Western Hemisphere and fifth-tallest in the world. A significant obstacle to the proposal was that current zoning at the site limits building heights to 400 feet (120 m). The proposal was not among the list of three finalists chosen by Prosper Portland (formerly known as the Portland Development Commission) in March 2018.

== Background ==
In 2016, the Portland Development Commission commissioned the redevelopment of the Broadway Corridor in the Pearl District of downtown Portland, Oregon. Included in the Broadway Corridor is the 14-acre USPS Portland Main Post Office site, bordered by Northwest 9th Avenue, Northwest Hoyt Street, Northwest Broadway and Northwest Lovejoy Street, which the city bought for $90 million dollars in 2016. The Broadway Corridor also includes Union Station. Portland-based architectural firm William Kaven Architecture, helmed by brothers Daniel Kaven and Trevor William Lewis, proposed a twin-towered skyscraper complex to replace the to-be-demolished postal building, potentially including a new high-speed rail system hub. The complex features two neomodern glass skyscrapers that would have reached a height of 970 feet and been connected by a sky-bridge that would be 680 feet high, featuring an observation deck and botanical garden. A significant obstacle to the proposal was that current zoning at the site limits building heights to just 400 feet, and the city council would have had to approve a major change to that element of the zoning for the proposal to be able to move forward.

If built, the skyscrapers would have become the tallest buildings in Oregon, surpassing the Wells Fargo Center. In addition, it would have become the fourth tallest buildings in the western United States (after the Wilshire Grand Center, Salesforce Tower and U.S. Bank Tower), as well as the tallest by roof height, and the tallest twin towers in the Western Hemisphere. The architecture firm that designed the proposed towers hoped that it could become the proposed second headquarters of Amazon and stated that "[t]he towers are large enough to serve as a headquarters for a Fortune 100 company". The complex would have featured 5 million square feet (460,000 m^{2}) of space. However, Portland was not included in Amazon's shortlist of candidate cities for its planned second headquarters, announced in January 2018.

In March 2018, Prosper Portland (the Portland Development Commission) revealed its selections for the three finalist candidates for redevelopment of the Post Office site, and William/Kaven Architecture's twin towers proposal had been eliminated. As a result, there was no need for the city council to consider the question of whether to approve the more-than-doubling of the maximum building height limit that the Twin Towers proposal would have required if pursued as proposed.

== See also ==
- Architecture of Portland, Oregon
- List of tallest buildings by U.S. state
- List of tallest buildings in Portland, Oregon
- List of tallest twin buildings and structures
