= Torre Planetarium =

Coordinates: 9°00′37″N 79°27′59″W

- Interactive map of the Torre Planetarium area

General information
- Status: Never built
- Type: Residential
- Architectural style: Modern
- Location: Costa del Este, Panama City, Panama
- Construction started: 2007
- Estimated completion: 2025
- Cost: US$100,000,000

Height
- Roof: 343.4 m (1,127 ft)

Technical details
- Material: Glass, Steel, with Smart Glass Technology
- Floor count: 92
- Floor area: 250,000 m^{2} (2,690,978 sq ft)
- Lifts/elevators: 20

Design and construction
- Architects: Mallol & Mallol Arquitectos
- Developer: Grupo VerdeAzul
- Structural engineer: Structural Affiliates International, Inc.

Other information
- Parking: 5 levels underground

Website
- Official website

The Torre Planetarium was a proposed two-tower skyscraper in the design development stage located in Panama City. The taller tower, Tower 1, was planned to be 343.4 metres (1,127 ft) tall and have 92 floors. The second and shorter Tower 2 was planned to be 305.8 metres (1,003 ft) tall and contain 82 floors. Both buildings were intended to have two levels of basements. The original design for Torre Planetarium was a 300 metres (984 ft) tall, 82-story tower.

== See also ==
- List of tallest buildings in Panama City
