= The Tower at City Place =

Residential building in White Plains, New York, US

Coordinates: 41.0320°N 73.7655°W

The Tower at City Place (formerly known as Trump Tower) is a 35-story condominium located at 10 City Place in the city of White Plains in Westchester County, New York. The building was designed by Costas Kondylis and Partners. It was completed in 2005, and it opened on September 21 of that year with 212 residences and 3 commercial spaces. On August 5, 2021, the condo unit owners voted to remove the Trump brand. A rebranding committee was formed consisting of twenty residents and a new name was chosen. In January 2022, the building's board filed declarations to the condo amendment with the new official name, The Tower at City Place. Full rebranding was completed in May 2022. The building is attached to a municipal parking building whose rooftop holds the outdoor amenities for The Tower at City Place residents. Rooftop amenities include two tennis courts, a putting green, playground, a basketball court, and a 20-meter (65.6 feet) long swimming pool (maximum depth of 1.42 meters (4 feet, 8 inches)), which is claimed to be "olympic size" in combination with the pool deck and lounge area, BBQ grilling stations and a bar area.

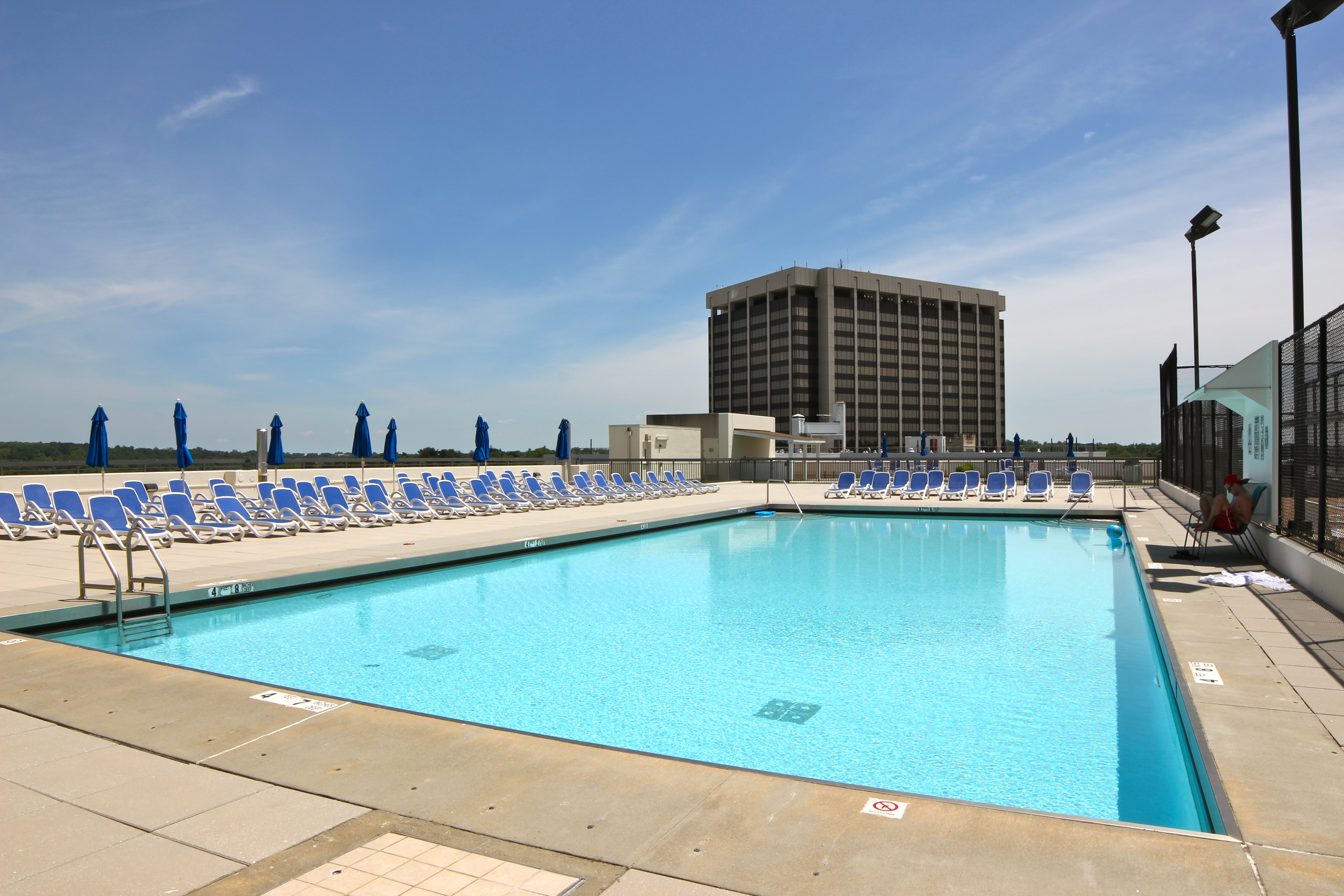
The Tower at City Place Swimming Pool
