= Old Chicago Main Post Office Twin Towers =

Proposed skyscraper in Chicago, Illinois

- Original rendition of the Old Chicago Main Post Office Redevelopment, including the Twin Towers.
- Interactive map of the Old Chicago Main Post Office Twin Towers area

General information
- Status: Never built
- Type: Residential, Commercial, Hotel
- Location: Chicago, Illinois, United States
- Coordinates: 41°52′30.0″N 87°38′14.8″W

Height
- Roof: 2,000 ft (610 m)

Technical details
- Floor count: 120

Design and construction
- Architect: Joseph Antunovich
- Developer: Bill Davies

The Old Chicago Main Post Office Twin Towers was a proposed mixed use supertall skyscraper planned as part of the vision Old Chicago Main Post Office Redevelopment project in the Chicago Loop community area. The 120-story twin towers were planned to reach a height of 2,000 feet (610 m), the same as the cancelled Chicago Spire that began construction in 2007. Had it been built according to plan, the building would have been the tallest in the United States.

== Details ==
In 2009, British real estate developer Bill Davies bought Chicago's Old Main Post Office for $24 million and in March 2011, he bought an adjacent property for $14 million. On July 21, 2011, Davies announced his plans for the Twin Towers within the Old Chicago Main Post Office Redevelopment. Davies' plans were filed by his company, International Property Developers. A previous 2,000-foot (610 m) building plan for the Chicago Spire stalled during the Great Recession. The plan was approved on July 18, 2013.

Joseph Antunovich was the architect. If built as planned, the 2,000-foot (610 m) building, which was intended as the second of three phases of the overall project, would have been the tallest in North America. The building was also intended to support revenue-generating communications antennas and to host commercial, hotel and residential facilities.

According to the New York Times, critics of the project noted potential problems with the proposed towers' proximity to the extant Sears Tower. For example, the heights of the residential accommodations in the planned building would have placed residents within the radiation impact zone from the antennas atop the Sears Tower. Also, there was a claim that the air convection surrounding the two buildings would create a vacuum.

In October 2014, Davies' joint venture for redevelopment with Sterling Bay was dissolved. In December 2014, Davies canceled the project and put the post office building up for sale.
