= Twin Towers 2 =

Once proposed building complex in Manhattan, New York

Twin Towers II
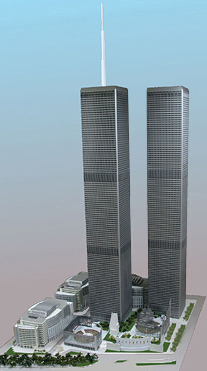
- The proposed World Trade Center site model. The new Twin Towers stand beside the memorials, which would have used the surviving exterior panels of the original towers.
- Former names: Plan of the People (original); World Trade Center Phoenix
- Alternative names: Twin Towers 2 New Twin Towers

General information
- Status: Never built
- Type: Office, observation, communication
- Location: Manhattan, New York City, United States

Height
- Architectural: 1 and 2 WTC: 1,475 ft (450 m)
- Antenna spire: 1 WTC: 1,858 ft (566 m)

Technical details
- Floor count: 1 and 2 WTC: 115; 3, 4, and 5 WTC: 12; 7 WTC: 52

Design and construction
- Architect: Herbert Belton
- Architecture firm: Team Twin Towers, Inc^{a}
- Engineer: Kenneth Gardner

Website
- Official website
- a. The organization was composed of architects and designers, led by Belton and Gardner.

The Twin Towers II (also known as Twin Towers 2, New Twin Towers, World Trade Center Phoenix (Note: Kenneth Gardner states that he and Jonathan Hakala, venture capitalist who was a tenant on the 77th floor of One World Trade Center, "call it the WTC Phoenix" (phoenix as in the bird, not the city).) and Michael W. Diamond Twin Towers) was a proposed twin-towered skyscraper complex which would have been located at the World Trade Center site in Manhattan, New York City. The proposed complex would have replaced the former Twin Towers of the World Trade Center destroyed in the September 11 attacks, restoring the skyline of the city to its former state. The main design for the proposed complex would have included twin towers, nearly identical to the original North and South towers designed by Minoru Yamasaki, though it would feature 115 stories-5 floors taller than the originals, among other differences. Beside the towers, an above-ground memorial would have occupied the footprints of the original towers. The new site would also have featured three 12-story buildings, replacing the original 3, 4 and 5 World Trade Center. The complex was designed and developed by American architect Herbert Belton and American engineer Kenneth Gardner.

In the mid-2020s, a similar proposal called World Technology Center was made in Chicago, which directly revives this initiative but with a focus on STEM fields. As of 2026, the project gained media attention and it is currently in the pre-development phase. It is being designed by Raphael Chryslar with support from Ken Gardner and others.

== Background (2001–2003) ==
After the events of the September 11 attacks in 2001, several ideas about building new twin towers were discussed online and in the media. After the Lower Manhattan Development Corporation (LMDC) launched the World Trade Center Site Memorial Competition in 2002, seven architectural groups were commissioned by the organization to create a proposal to restore the Manhattan skyline. Out of the seven, four groups proposed building twin towers though they were not identical to the original design by Minoru Yamasaki. After Daniel Libeskind's Memory Foundations design was favored and then chosen by the Lower Manhattan Development Corporation in 2003, the proposed twin-towered designs were rejected. The result of the competition and the design chosen by the LMDC was criticized by the public, including architectural critic Herbert Muschamp as well as Donald Trump. The twin-towered Team Twin Towers design was planned to be entered into the World Trade Center Site Memorial Competition, but was unable to complete the design before the competition closed.

== Initial emergence (2004) ==
The initial planning of the project first surfaced in the media in 2004 with the group behind the project called Team Twin Towers, Inc., composed of activists and designers collaborating on the early design of the model. The team was initially led by television producer and co-founder of the team Randy Warner, and the design led by engineer Kenneth "Ken" Gardner and architect Herbert Belton, who was an architect for the original World Trade Center. Their spokesman was Jonathan Hakala, a venture capitalist who had been a tenant on the 77th floor of the original North Tower. The project design was called the "Plan of the People", and would be identical to the original Yamasaki design.

The new design would feature a steel skin built in two layers–a tube within a tube–that has heavier columns and better structural support than the original, and it would call for larger windows for comfort and improved fireproofing. The memorial would feature two 5-story memorials that would occupy the original footprints of the Twin Towers, made of the original steel skin of the collapsed towers and replicated steel. The would be etched in granite. "It stands for resolve, it stands for strength, it stands for renewal", says engineer of the project Ken Gardner. "To see the towers return would have an inspirational impact on the population. It's a living memorial, and I think it's more powerful than pretending 9/11 never happened." The main twin towers originally would feature a 500-foot-high mast on top of the North Tower, which would bring its total height to 1,888 feet, which at the time would have made it the tallest building in the world surpassing the 1,667-foot-high Taipei 101 in Taipei, Taiwan and the tallest twin towers in the world surpassing the 1,483-feet-high Petronas Towers in Kuala Lumpur, Malaysia. The two towers were planned to be 112 stories tall.

Team Twin Towers was one of several groups pressuring government and development officials to alter the reconstruction plans of the Libeskind master plan chosen by the Lower Manhattan Development Corporation. Joanna Rose, spokeswoman for the LMDC, which was coordinating reconstruction at the site, said the organization intended to go forward with its chosen plan. Randy Warner, co-founder of Team Twin Towers said: "As long as we haven't started digging a hole in the ground, there's room for discussion."

Team Twin Towers, on February 18, 2004, unveiled their architectural model of new twin towers at a news conference at the Marriott Financial Center Hotel (now New York Marriott Downtown) near the World Trade Center site. Team Twin Towers spokesman Jonathan Hakala says the original Twin Towers "were among Earth's few 'instantly recognizable' landmarks." and "It was a magnificent structure to see going up", recalls Artie Vignapiano, who was a Port Authority landscape planner as the original World Trade Center was built. "When I worked on the 74th floor of Tower One, I used to tell people, 'You know what I get paid for? To look outside my window at the Statue of Liberty.'" He then went on to say, 'All of the people who worked on the buildings—10 out of 10—want them back.'"

Later in February, Trump appeared on CNN show Larry King Live with Larry King. During a talk radio broadcast, a caller asked whether Trump was involved or going to be involved with the "new twin towers". Though Trump at the time was not involved with the Team Twin Towers project, he became a sponsor of the project's design in the later year(s). Trump said the following about David Childs and Daniel Libeskind's design of One World Trade Center:

It's in the hands of a man named Larry Silverstein, who's a friend of mine, who's a great developer in New York and a really good guy. And I hate the design, and I don't think Larry likes the design. It was foisted upon him. It's a 50-story building that looks like it's 120 stories. It's a skeleton. And that's the last thing we need in New York is a skeleton of – representing the World Trade Center. I think that it is not an appropriate design. I don't like it. But Larry's a good developer. He'll get it built, I think. And it's tough. You know, it depends on the market.

== Early development (2005–2007) ==
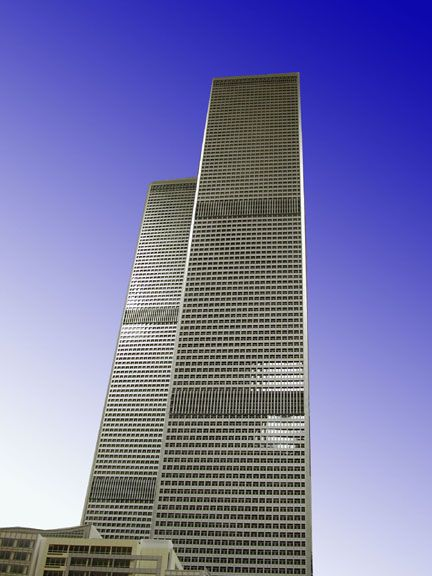
Early design for the proposed complex, c. 2007

In 2005, publicity for the project increased, with Trump officially supporting and sponsoring the project. Support for the project increased due to the criticism of the Childs-Libeskind design and accusations from 2002 revived against former New York Governor George Pataki, accused of cronyism for supposedly using his influence to get the winning architect's design picked as a personal favor for his friend and campaign contributor, Ron Lauder. In May 2005, Trump appeared on Hardball with Chris Matthews to discuss the proposed Childs-Libeskind Freedom Tower design. While Matthews asks Trump about whether an empty site is better than the proposed design, he quickly responds, criticizing Libeskind, "It was designed by an egghead architect who really doesn't have a lot of experience of designing something like this. And it's just a terrible design." Trump later goes on to say that he doesn't "even blame the architect." Trump, who in later month(s) sponsored the project, said that there is "not much of a role I can take." in response to a question by Matthews. "What I want to see built is the World Trade Center stronger and maybe a story taller. And that's what everybody wants."

While the project was gaining publicity due to Donald Trump's sponsorship of it, former Borough president of The Bronx, Fernando Ferrer, supported the plan to build new twin towers, saying that it is "very interesting and it should be considered." adding that the new signature building shouldn't look "cowardly." Before the statement, Ferrer issued a rebuilding plan that called to spread out the 10 million square feet of office space around the five boroughs so it "decentralized." Ferrer spokeswoman Jen Bluestein said that "The reason, he said then, was to create back-office space to help the boroughs outside Manhattan. He also didn't want to give the terrorists another target." she continued to explain, "Fernando Ferrer has always believed that the mayor's responsibility was to both rebuild critical mass at Ground Zero and, using existing hubs, expand office space throughout the five boroughs. Unfortunately, Mayor Bloomberg has managed to do neither".

Greg Manning, who worked in the original World Trade Center along with his wife Lauren, wrote an article in The New York Times supporting the Twin Towers II project. Greg worked for Euro Brokers on the 84th floor of the South Tower and Lauren was a partner for Cantor Fitzgerald on the 105th floor of the North Tower. Manning was late, so he was not in his office when United Airlines Flight 175 crashed into the building, destroying the Euro Brokers offices. His wife Lauren was burnt by the fireball that blew out the lobby of the North Tower after American Airlines Flight 11 hit the building. Greg said the following about the project:

When my wife and I visit or pass by the site today, we may gape at the emptiness but our gaze is drawn upward. We imagine things as they were, the dead and the injured still living and working above. Many bereft families view the footprints as the sacred repose of their loved ones, yet with the greatest tenderness and love for those lost and injured, we suggest that to return to the sacred space, we need to return to the sky.

Trump, on May 18, 2005, held a press conference at his residence on Fifth Avenue in Midtown Manhattan, to address the proposed Twin Towers II design. Along with him was engineer Ken Gardner and architect Herbert Belton, Trump presented the Team Twin Towers designed twin-towered complex model. The Freedom Tower plan, according to Trump, "looks like a junkyard, a series of broken-down angles that don't match each other. And we have to live with this for hundreds of years? It is the worst pile of crap architecture I've ever seen in my life." Though Trump was supporting the proposed twin-towered project, he was leaving the decision up to Larry Silverstein, whose company Silverstein Properties leased the site. "I only have the power of persuasion", Trump said. At the press conference, he read from a letter sent to him by Libeskind. Trump quoted Libeskind as saying the shape of the tower was "the product of David Childs", while he wanted a more slender, classical tower set back farther from the street. Libeskind added in a statement Wednesday: "The site plan is not just about commercial buildings. The memorial is its crucial centerpiece. It is there for a reason." Trump, finishing his speech, said that "If we rebuild the World Trade Center in the form of a skeleton, the terrorists win." and that if tenants could not be found for the project, to build a memorial park instead.

A final design for the "Freedom Tower" was formally unveiled on June 28, 2005. To address security issues raised by the New York City Police Department, a 187-foot (57 m) concrete base was added to the design in April of that year. The design originally included plans to clad the base in glass prisms in order to address criticism that the building might have looked uninviting and resembled a "concrete bunker". Construction of the Freedom Tower began in April 2006, which jeopardized the Twin Towers II project from being built on the site.

== Later developments ==
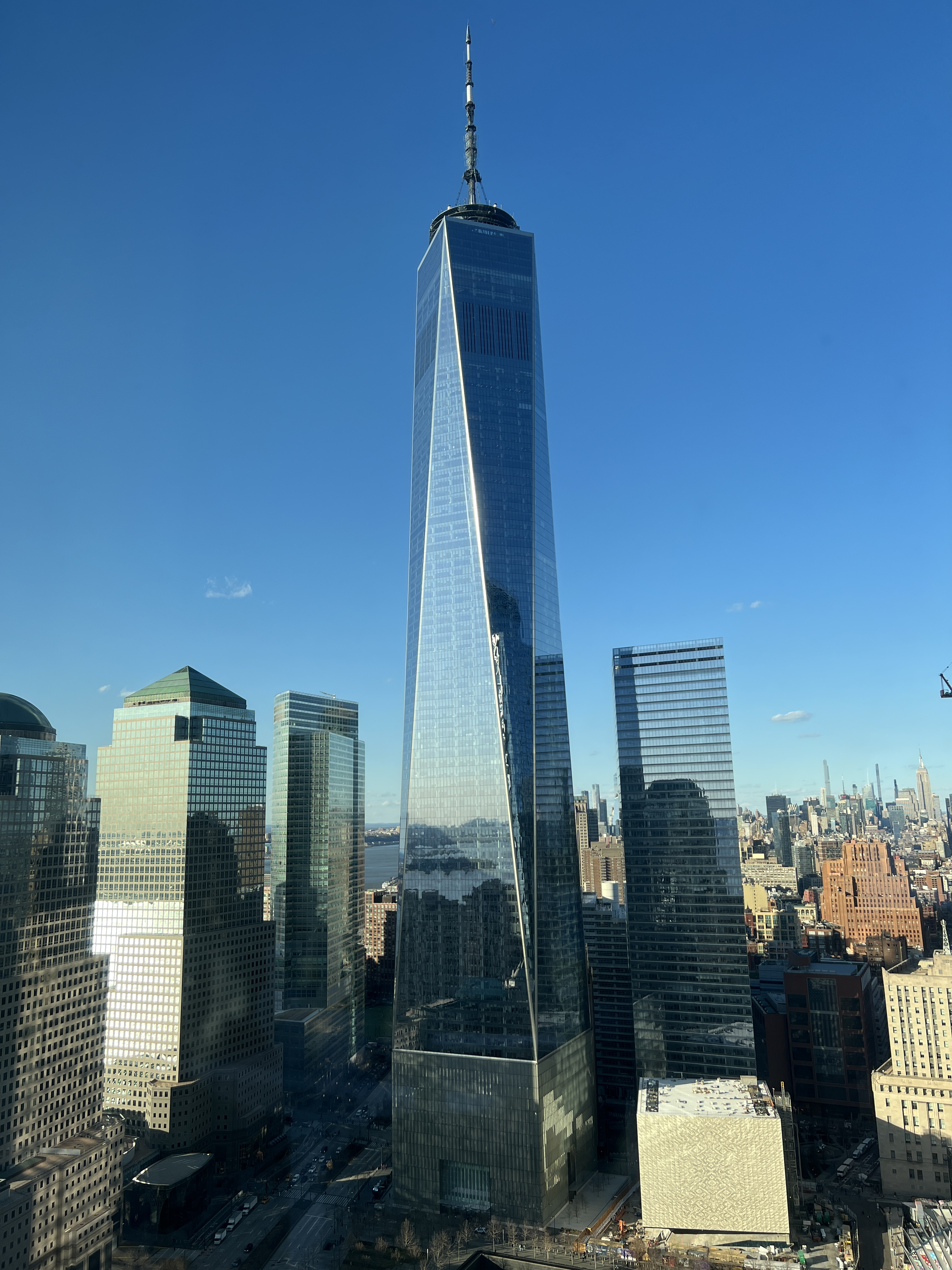
One World Trade Center, the main building of the rebuilt World Trade Center complex, in 2022

Criticism arose in 2008 that the rebuilding of the World Trade Center was taking longer than expected. Though now renamed One World Trade Center (formerly Freedom Tower) was under construction as well as the National September 11 Memorial & Museum, it was still proposed to halt One World Trade Center and build the Twin Towers II project. "Seeing them go up could be as powerful as seeing them go down." Ken Gardner stated, engineer of the project.

Since 2008, news of the project, as well as if it could still be built, had not been mentioned. Due to the completion of One, Three, and Four World Trade Center, as well as the memorial and museum, the project was very unlikely to be built.

Bjarke Ingels, who was selected as the architect for Two World Trade Center's new design, stated that he would have rebuilt the World Trade Center if it were up to him. He commented, stating that "They were such a big part of the identity of Manhattan. When you watch Tony Soprano drive out of the Holland Tunnel, he can see the towers in his rearview mirror. They looked very strong."

== Proposed revival in Chicago ==
In the mid-2020s, a proposal called the World Technology Center emerged, which directly revives the original New York concept. It would be built in Chicago by 2050 and would function as a hub for STEM research, development and education, essentially a vertical national laboratory with public and nature amenities. Its mission (and name) comes from the fundamental definition of technology as the practical use of scientific knowledge for human goals. The project is spearheaded by Raphael Chryslar, a UK-based aerospace engineer. In 2026, the World Tech Center vision has gained media attention, which often incorrectly interpreted the proposal as a data center. Ken Gardner - who was the structural engineer for Twin Towers II, has joined the initiative. The project is currently in its pre-development phase and has both support and criticism.

Early design renderings showcase a 35-acre (14-hectare) eight-building campus consisting of two 110-story twin towers with blue glass façade, standing 1,510 ft (460 m) to the roof, and 1,969 ft (600 m) to the spire (on the Science South Tower), which aims to symbolize the Apollo 11 moon landing. Amongst the towers are several 10-story buildings facilitating multipurpose laboratory environments and workspace equipped with cleanrooms and learning facilities. Each would have rooftop gardens. The masterplan also incorporates a government workshop, music venue, shopping mall, hotel, in addition to a variety of integrated urban green space and residences on the upper thirds of both towers. The central public plaza would be named after Richard Feynman. A rooftop garden and viewing platform called the Open Heavens Observation Deck would be perched atop the North Tower. If built, it would be the highest outdoor viewing platform in the Western Hemisphere.
