= Handel Architects =

American architecture firm

Handel Architects LLP is an architecture firm that was founded in New York City in 1994. Led by Partner Gary Handel, the firm has offices in New York City, Boston, San Francisco, Denver, and Hong Kong.

The firm has five partners, Gary Handel, Blake Middleton, Glenn Rescalvo, Frank Fusaro, and Michael Arad. Well-known projects include Cornell University's New York City Tech Campus Residential Tower, Millennium Tower, the Ritz-Carlton in Washington, DC, and the National September 11 Memorial in Lower Manhattan.

== Works and projects ==
=== United States ===
==== New York City ====
- Madison House, NoMad, Manhattan
- The Essex at Essex Crossing, New York, NY
- 180 Broome at Essex Crossing, New York, NY
- One Blue Slip, Greenpoint, Brooklyn
- Cornell Tech Campus Residential Tower, New York, NY
- Sendero Verde, Harlem, New York, NY
- Pier 57 (SuperPier) Renovation and Restoration, New York, NY
- Enclave at The Cathedral of St. John the Divine, New York, NY
- National September 11 Memorial, Lower Manhattan, New York, NY
- The Dominick, SoHo
- 33 Bond, Brooklyn, New York
- House 39, New York, NY
- Dream Downtown Hotel, Chelsea, Manhattan
- 37 Warren Street, New York, NY
- Inspir Carnegie Hill, New York, NY
- Fifth Street Farm Green Roof, New York, NY
- 150 East 72nd Street Renovation, New York, NY
- 530 Park Avenue Renovation, New York, NY
- The Caledonia, New York, NY
- 737 Park Avenue Renovation, New York, NY
- Ritz-Carlton, Battery Park, New York, NY
- The Corner at 200 W 72nd Street, New York, NY
- Lincoln West, New York, NY
- Lincoln Triangle, New York, NY
- Lincoln Square, New York, NY
- 455, 505 West 37th Street, New York, NY
- 525 West 52nd Street, New York, NY
- Millennium Point (New York City), New York, NY
- 255 Hudson Street, New York, NY
- 505 Greenwich Street, New York, NY
- Truffles Tribeca, New York, NY
- Ritz-Carlton Central Park, New York, NY
- Aire at 150 Amsterdam, New York, NY
- 170 Amsterdam, New York, NY
- Long Island City Marriott and Aurora Residences, Queens, NY
- Flushing Meadows Natatorium, Flushing Meadows–Corona Park, Queens, NY
- The View at Queens West, Queens, NY
- Summit, New York, NY
- Hoyt & Horn, Brooklyn, NY
- Linden 78, New York, NY
- The Easton and Windward School, New York, NY
- Idlewild Park Nature Center, Queens, NY

==== San Francisco ====
- Serif and The Line Hotel at 950 Market Street, San Francisco
- Four Seasons Private Residences at 706 Mission, San Francisco
- 288 Pacific, Jackson Square, San Francisco
- The Pacific, San Francisco
- Rowan at 346 Potrero, San Francisco
- NEMA at 10th and Market, San Francisco
- Millennium Tower (San Francisco), Financial District, San Francisco.
- 950 Tennessee, San Francisco
- Nove Residences, Mission District, San Francisco
- Four Seasons Hotel, San Francisco, San Francisco
- Blu Residences, San Francisco
- 340 Fremont Street, San Francisco
- 1554 Market Street, San Francisco
- Union House, San Francisco
- 450 Hayes Street, San Francisco
- 2301 Lombard Street, San Francisco
- 570 Jessie Street, San Francisco
- 531 Bryant, San Francisco

==== Washington, D.C. ====
- The Ritz-Carlton, Washington, D.C., West End, Washington, D.C.
- The Ritz-Carlton, Georgetown, Washington, D.C.
- 3303 Water Street, Washington, D.C.
- Vio & Incanto at The Wharf, Washington, D.C.
- The Bower, Washington, D.C.

==== Boston ====
- Winthrop Center (formerly Winthrop Square Tower)
- Ipswich Studio Building at Boston Conservatory, Fenway–Kenmore
- Hemenway Building at Boston Conservatory, Fenway–Kenmore
- Millennium Place, Downtown Crossing
- Millennium Tower Boston, Downtown Crossing
- Ritz-Carlton Hotel & Residences, Downtown Crossing

==== Jersey City ====
- Journal Squared
- Artwalk Towers

==== Los Angeles ====
- Ten Thousand, Los Angeles, CA
- Hollywood Center, Hollywood, Los Angeles, CA
- Angels Landing

==== Santa Barbara ====
- Santa Barbara Bowl, Santa Barbara, California

==== Philadelphia ====
- The Residences at The Ritz-Carlton (Philadelphia), Center City, Philadelphia

==== Asbury Park ====
- Asbury Ocean Club Hotel, Asbury Park, New Jersey

==== Miami ====
- Four Seasons Hotel Miami, Downtown Miami

==== Atlanta ====
- Ritz-Carlton Buckhead Residences and Office

==== Chicago ====
- OneEleven, Chicago, IL

==== Austin ====
- Austin Proper Hotel & Residences, Austin, TX

==== Charleston ====
- Emanuel Nine Memorial, Charleston, SC.

==== Raleigh ====
- Quorum Center, Raleigh, NC

==== Honolulu ====
- Hokua at 1288 Ala Moana, Honolulu, HI

==== Weehawken ====
- 1000 Avenue, Weehawken, New Jersey
- 1200 Avenue, Weehawken, New Jersey

=== Chile ===
- W Hotel Santiago, Santiago
- Territoria El Bosque, Santiago
- Alto El Golf, Santiago

=== Indonesia ===
- SSI Tower, Jakarta

=== Philippines ===
- Shangri-La at the Fort, Manila, Bonifacio Global City
- Philippine Stock Exchange Tower, Manila, Bonifacio Global City
- East Gallery Place, Manila, Bonifacio Global City
- West Gallery Place, Manila, Bonifacio Global City

=== Sri Lanka ===
- Shangri-La Colombo

=== Taiwan ===
- Xin Dian Tower, Taipei
- Le M Residence, New Taipei City
- CMP Taichung Intercontinental Hotel, Taichung

=== United Arab Emirates ===
- Rosewood Abu Dhabi, Abu Dhabi
- Aykon City, Dubai
