= 737 =

737 most commonly refers to:

- Boeing 737, an American narrow-body passenger airplane
  - Boeing 737 Original
  - Boeing 737 Classic
  - Boeing 737 Next Generation
  - Boeing 737 MAX
- AD 737, a year in the common era
- 737 BC, a year
- 737 (number), a number

737 may also refer to:

== Arts, entertainment, and media ==
=== Literature ===
- Minuscule 737, a Greek minuscule manuscript

=== Television ===
- Pinoy Big Brother: 737, a twelfth season of Pinoy Big Brother
- "Seven Thirty-Seven", a season 2 episode of Breaking Bad

== Places ==
- 737 area code, a telephone area code in Austin, Texas, United States
- 737 Park Avenue, a residential building in New York City, New York, United States
- 737 Vancouver Street, a Victorian-style home in Victoria, British Columbia, Canada

== Military ==
- 737 Naval Air Squadron, a Royal Navy helicopter squadron
- 737th Expeditionary Airlift Squadron, a provisional United States Air Force unit
- USS Kentucky (SSBN-737), an Ohio-class ballistic missile submarine

== Science and technology ==
- 737 Arequipa, a minor planet
- ABT-737, a small molecule drug
- Code page 737, a Greek language code page

== Transportation ==
=== Automobiles ===
- Enranger 737, a Chinese compact MPV
- Mazda 737C, a Japanese prototype racing car

=== Train types ===
- 737 series (JR Hokkaido), a Japanese train type operated by Hokkaido Railway Company (JR Hokkaido)

=== Roads and routes ===
==== Canada ====
- Saskatchewan Highway 737

==== Costa Rica ====
- National Route 737 (Costa Rica), a highway in Alajuela

==== United States ====
- Louisiana Highway 737
- Pennsylvania Route 737
- Farm to Market Road 737, two different former roads in Texas

== Other uses ==
- 737, symbol used in tattoos and other markings by the gang Public Enemy No. 1 (gang)
