= WVT =

WVT may refer to:

- Waterview Tower, a skyscraper in Chicago
- Web visitor tracking
- Watervliet Arsenal
- Waverton railway station, Sydney, Australia, by Sydney Trains station code
