= Philippine Stock Exchange Tower =

Office skyscraper in Taguig, Philippines

- The PSE Tower in Bonifacio Global City
- Interactive map of the Philippine Stock Exchange Tower area

General information
- Status: Completed
- Type: Office
- Location: One Bonifacio High Street, 5th Avenue cor. 28th Street, Bonifacio Global City, Taguig, Metro Manila, Philippines
- Coordinates: 14°33′05″N 121°02′49″E
- Construction started: 2012
- Completed: 2017
- Cost: ₱ 3.5 Billion
- Owner: Philippine Stock Exchange

Height
- Roof: 114.41 m (375.36 ft)

Technical details
- Floor count: 30
- Floor area: 50,000 m^{2} (538,195.52 sq ft) (total floor area); 41,389 m^{2} (445,507.49 sq ft) (gross leasable area)
- Lifts/elevators: 10

Design and construction
- Architecture firm: Handel Architects together with Leandro V Locsin Partners and GF & Partners Architects
- Developer: Ayala Land Premier
- Main contractor: Makati Development Corporation (MDC)

The Philippine Stock Exchange Tower is an office skyscraper in One Bonifacio High Street, Bonifacio Global City in Taguig. The building has 30 floors above ground level. It serves as the new headquarters and unified trading floor of the Philippine Stock Exchange. The building is characterized as an all-glass, grade A level building. It is occupied by the stock brokers and trading managers of the PSE.

== History ==
The construction of the PSE Tower was originally planned in 2004, as part of the stock exchange's plans to unite the exchanges under one building, but hurdles such as location planning, naming rights, and the building's design put this plan on hold until 2008. One noted example of the planned designs featured renders inspired from the Commerzbank Tower in Frankfurt, Germany, which was designed by Skidmore, Owings & Merrill, and was planned to have a height of 229 m (751 ft). The building became part of the One Bonifacio High Street Project, a 2.35-hectare (5.8-acre) high end mixed-use development located in the northern area in Bonifacio Global City (BGC), which comprises the Philippine Stock Exchange Tower, The Suites at One Bonifacio High Street, the Shangri-La at the Fort, and the One Bonifacio High Street Mall. The entire high end complex costed a total of ₱30 billion.

The building was built on a property donated by Fort Bonifacio Development Corp. to the PSE. The PSE then gave its rights to the donated property to Ayala Land Inc. in exchange for several units in the new building.

Groundbreaking was initially planned in January 2009, and is planned to be completed in 2012, yet the groundbreaking was held in 2012, and the tower was topped off in 2017, before being opened in February 2018.

== Architecture ==
The tower was designed by US-based Handel Architects, in collaboration with Leandro V Locsin Partners and GF & Partners Architects. The PSE Tower features an all-glass inflected glazed facade with modern contemporary architecture, glass awnings, sloped rooflines, and asymmetrical elements that also has vertical ribs for solar control along 5th Avenue, while complementing it to neighboring buildings such as the Shangri-La at the Fort, Manila and The Suites at One Bonifacio High Street, giving the tower a sleek and striking integrated design. The tower also features a large LED ticker displaying real-time stock market data to potential onlookers.

== Facilities ==
The Ground Level of the Philippine Stock Exchange Tower in Bonifacio Global City.

=== Trading Floor ===
Although smaller than the previous trading floors, due to the trend of trades became more computerized, the PSE Tower has a 695 m^{2} (7,480.92 sq ft) unified trading floor from both traders of the Exchange Plaza in the Makati Central Business District and the Philippine Stock Exchange Centre at the Ortigas Center, in Pasig City.

On 24 June 2022, the unified trading floor was closed, as PSE President and CEO Ramon Monzon stated that since the tower's opening, only 85 of 132 active trading participants availed for booths and dealer rooms on the trading floor. Another factor that was observed was during the closed face-to-face trading sessions caused the COVID-19 community quarantines in the country, the lockdown prompted traders to integrate their systems to the PSE's online trading platform, which led to further improvements on the digitization of trades within the exchange. As the lockdown measures decreased in the middle of 2021 to early 2022, only 29 of the 85 remaining trading participants opted the use of the trading floor, which prompted the PSE to fully close the trading floor, and will be repurposed for mixed-use activities.

The present trading floor was repurposed into a events hall on 29 May 2023. The events hall also maintained the usage of the trading bells and ticker screens while renovations were made, which features a new LED market board displaying the stock exchange's overall trading data, graphs, and prices, and replaced the former hanging LED screen. The hall also serves as a venue for initial public offerings, follow-on offerings, stock rights offerings, and other events. The opening of the events hall was graced by PSE Officials, government officials, and other executives.

=== Museum ===
Th PSE Museum is museum located within the tower. The museum features records, archives and other historical pieces of the PSE, allowing visitors to look back at the history of the Philippine Stock Exchange from its foundation in 1927.

=== Retail ===
The tower also houses retail shops in the mezzanine and ground floors, and is directly connected to the One Bonifacio High Street Mall, a 23,000 square meters (250,000 sq ft) mall currently occupied by fashion brands and food choices.
