= Angels Landing (Los Angeles) =

Proposed high-rise development in Los Angeles, California

- Location within the Los Angeles metropolitan area

General information
- Type: Retail, hotels and residential
- Architectural style: Modern
- Location: 4th & Hill St. Los Angeles, California, United States
- Coordinates: 34.0500°N 118.2593°W
- Completed: 2028 (planned)
- Cost: $1.6 billion
- Owner: City of Los Angeles
- Operator: Handel Architects

Height
- Top floor: 854 ft (260 m)

Technical details
- Floor count: 64
- Floor area: 2 million sq/ft

Design and construction
- Architect: Handel Architects
- Developer: Angels Landing Partners LLC, Claridge Properties, The Peebles Corporation, MacFarlane Partners

Angels Landing is a planned high-rise development in the Bunker Hill neighborhood of Downtown Los Angeles, California. The intended design consisted of a mixed-use complex centered around two high-rise towers. Though the contract to build the complex was awarded in 2017, the site is currently the subject of litigation between Angels Landing Partners and the City of Los Angeles, and as of 2026 no work has proceeded on the complex.

At the southeast corner of the site is a portal for the Pershing Square station serving the Metro B and D lines. The site is next to Angels Flight and the adjacent public staircase, across the street from Grand Central Market and near Pershing Square. The 2.2-acre (0.89 ha) sloping site in the Bunker Hill neighborhood is owned by the City of Los Angeles. The site was the former Angels Knoll Park, made popular by the 2009 film 500 Days of Summer.

== Development ==
The Angels Landing project was proposed as a $1.6 billion high-rise complex consisting of two towers with luxury hotels, residential units, and a retail plaza. In December 2017, the Los Angeles City Council awarded the development contract to Don Peebles of Peebles Corporation and Victor MacFarlene.

The Peebles Corporation and MacFarlene Partners failed to get the project past any preconstruction milestones after being awarded the project. The project has failed to progress meaningfully over several years and as of 2026, no construction has begun, few plans have been filed, and the site remains vacant. Peebles and MacFarlene reportedly had a history of stalled or incomplete projects with no high-rise development and experience, and their ambitious proposal had little real world potential of completion.

== Litigation ==
Angels Landing Partners and the City of Los Angeles are currently engaged in litigation in relation to the cancellation of ALP's contract. City officials and media reports accused the Peebles-led team of gross mismanagement, citing missed deadlines, lack of financing transparency, and an overreliance on branding and publicity rather than financial execution.

In early 2025, the City of Los Angeles initiated legal action against Peebles Corporation, seeking to reclaim the land originally awarded for Angels Landing. In turn, the Peebles Corporation filed a countersuit claiming wrongful termination and political interference. The city accused the team of stalling progress while seeking to renegotiate terms favorable to private interests, while Peebles claimed racism and bias affected work with the city government.

== See also ==
- Angels Flight (adjacent)
- List of tallest buildings in Los Angeles
