= 340 Fremont Street =

Residential skyscraper in San Francisco, California

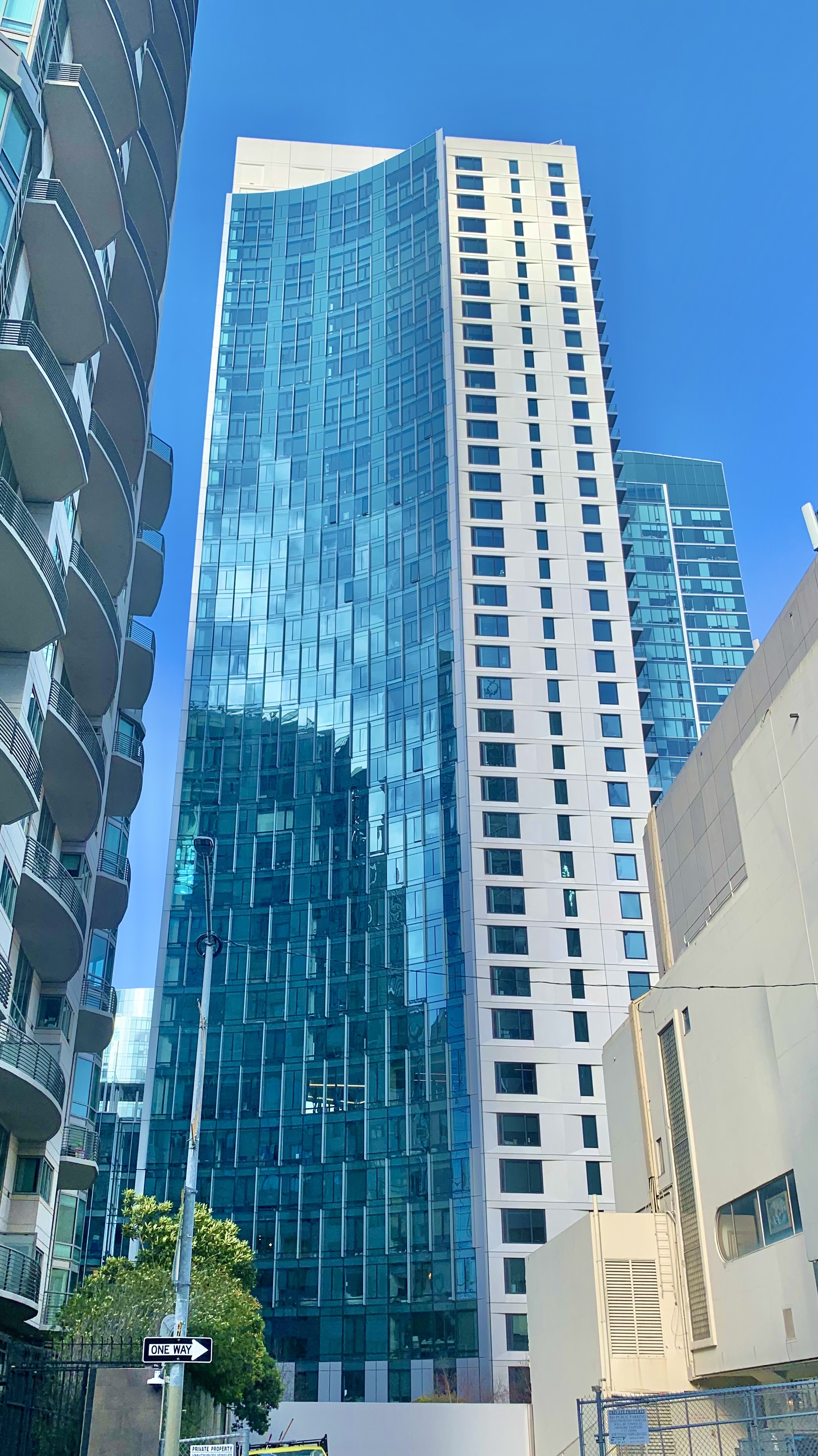
- In 2021

- Location within San Francisco 340 Fremont Street (California) 340 Fremont Street (the United States)
- Alternative names: 340-350 Fremont Street

General information
- Status: Completed
- Type: Residential apartments
- Location: 340 Fremont Street; San Francisco, California
- Coordinates: 37.78704°N 122.39296°W
- Construction started: April 2014
- Completed: August 2016
- Cost: US$160 million

Height
- Architectural: 440 ft (130 m)
- Roof: 400 ft (120 m)

Technical details
- Floor count: 40
- Floor area: 290,000 sq ft (27,000 m^{2})

Design and construction
- Architect: Handel Architects
- Developer: Equity Residential
- Main contractor: Suffolk Construction Company

Other information
- Number of units: 348
- Parking: 269

340 Fremont Street is a 440-foot (130 m) residential skyscraper in the Rincon Hill neighborhood of San Francisco, California. The tower has 348 residential units on 40 floors.

== History ==
As part of the Rincon Hill Plan adopted in August 2005, the parcels at 340 Fremont and 350 Fremont were up-zoned for a single 400-foot (120 m) residential tower. Developed by Archstone Smith and Jackson Pacific Ventures, and initially designed by Heller Manus Architects, the development was approved for 332 residential units with 332 underground parking spaces by the San Francisco Planning Commission on June 15, 2006.

Due to the United States housing market correction and the 2008 financial crisis, construction was delayed. During 2008 to 2013, a period of market recovery, the project received five consecutive 12-month extensions of its entitlements. In 2012, the project was redesigned by Handel Architects, and the number of units was increased to 348, while the number of parking spaces was reduced to 269.

In 2013, the project entitlements were acquired by Equity Residential, with plans to break ground by the end of 2013. In late 2013, demolition and construction permits were issued but a neighboring homeowner association appealed the permits. In February 2014, the appeal was denied, clearing the way for construction to begin. Demolition of existing structures on the site began in March 2014. Ceremonial groundbreaking took place on April 24, 2014. The building was topped-out on October 22, 2015, and residents began moving in mid-2016.

== Design ==
The project features 348 residential units, consisting of 91 studios, 119 one-bedrooms, and 138 two-bedrooms. 269 parking spaces are located on three underground levels, primarily in stackers. The building has an 85-foot (26 m) podium, topped with an outdoor terrace. The tower reaches a roof height of 400 feet (120 m) with a 40-foot (12 m) mechanical penthouse, resulting in a total structural height of 440 feet (130 m).

Previous structures on the site that were razed included a 3-story building at 340 Fremont Street, constructed in 1962, once occupied by the National Maritime Engineers Benefit Association, and 350 Fremont Street, constructed in 1952, which was previously occupied by the Seafarer's Union. To partially mitigate the loss of the "maritime labor historic context", the project will include a publicly accessible interpretive display in a midblock passage off Fremont Street.

== Gallery ==
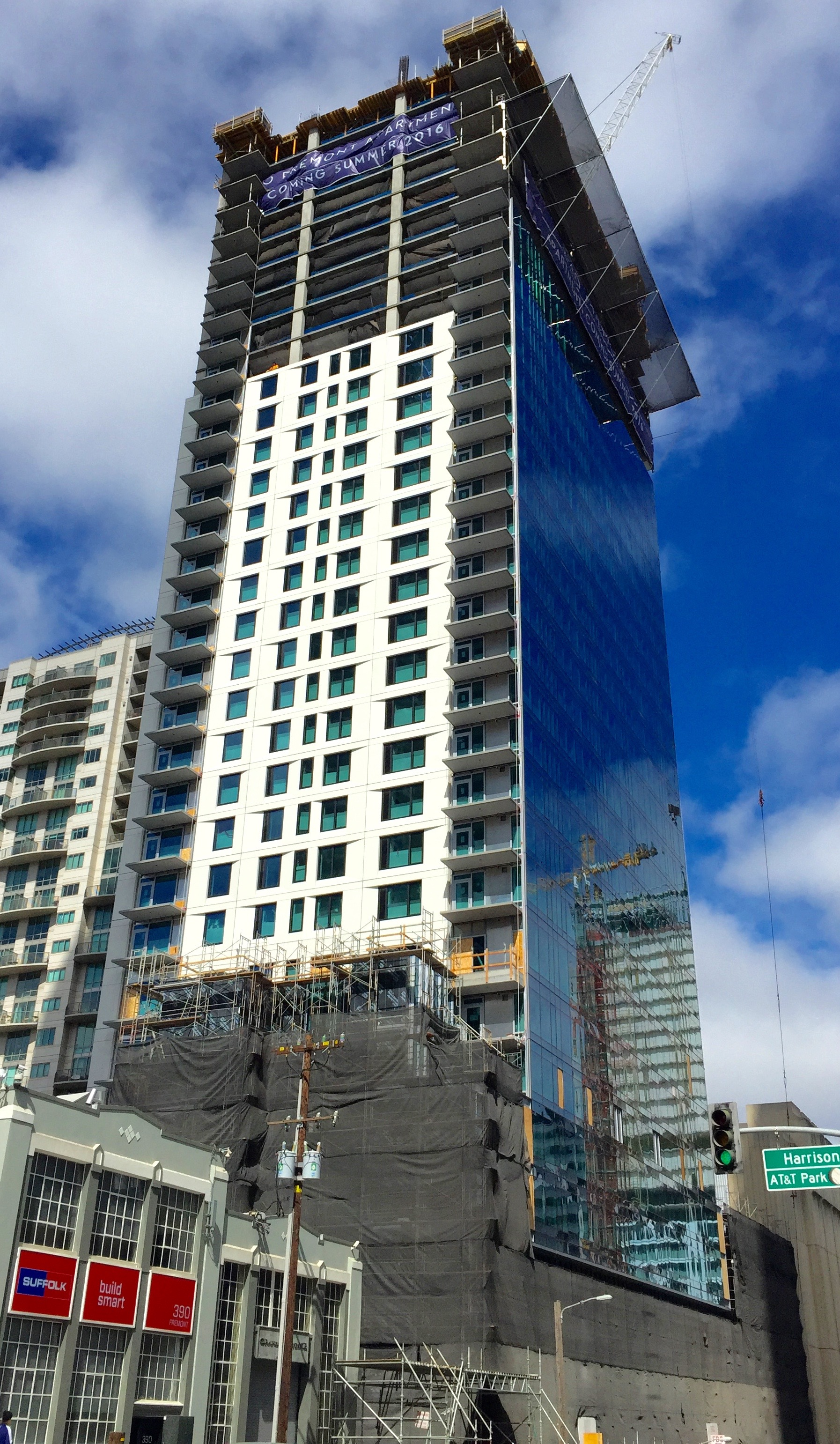
Under Construction in August 2015, South View

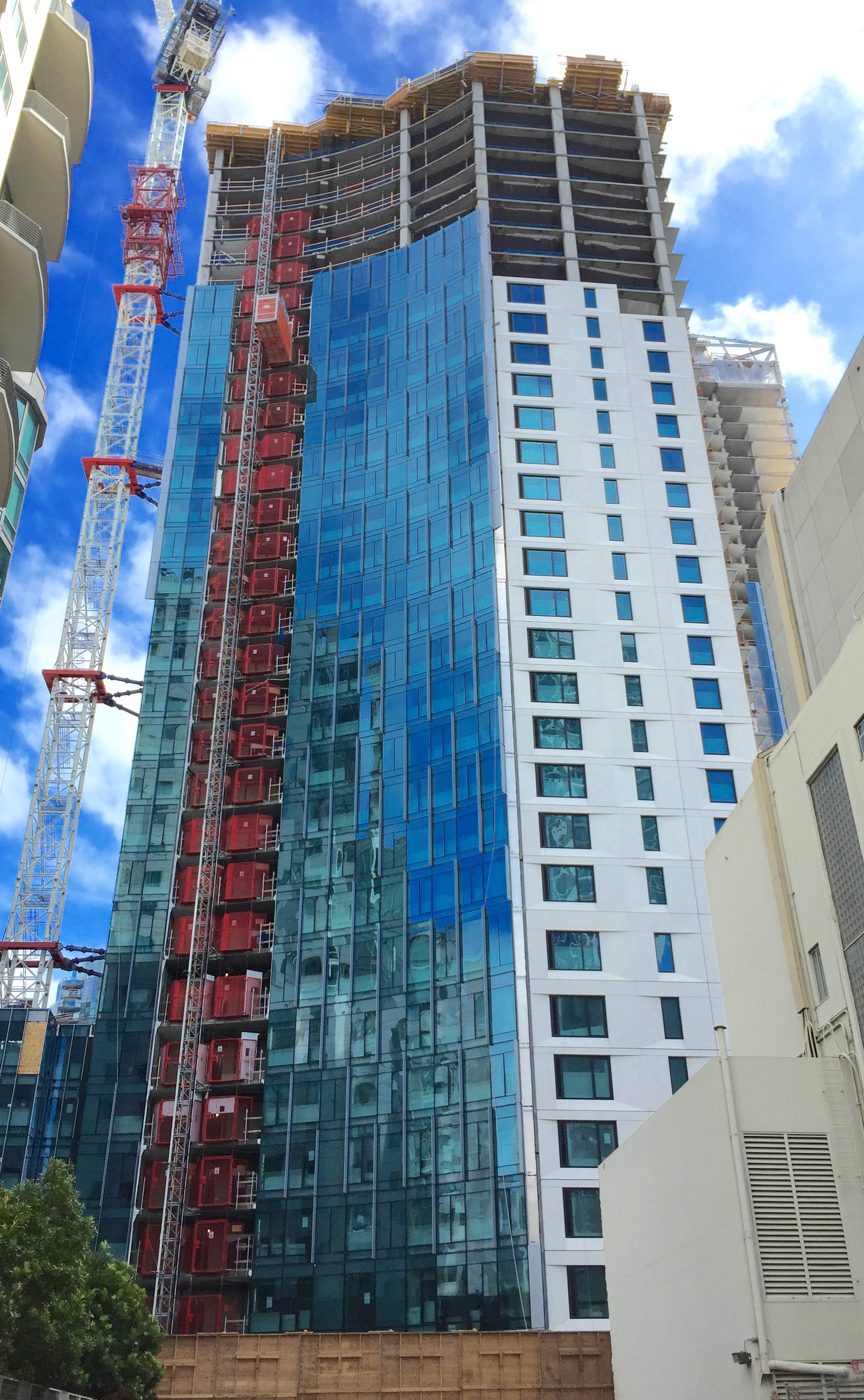
Under Construction in August 2015, West View

== See also ==
- List of tallest buildings in San Francisco
