= Artwalk Towers =

Residential skyscraper complex in Jersey City, New Jersey

813 Pavonia Avenue

General information
- Status: Under construction
- Type: Residential
- Construction started: 2025

Height
- Roof: 560 feet (170 m)

Technical details
- Floor count: 49

Design and construction
- Architect: Handel Architects
- Developer: Kushner Real Estate Group

808 Pavonia Avenue

General information
- Status: Approved
- Type: Residential

Height
- Roof: 620 feet (190 m)

Technical details
- Floor count: 55

Design and construction
- Architect: Handel Architects
- Developer: Kushner Real Estate Group

Artwalk Towers is a residential high-rise development under construction in the Journal Square neighborhood of Jersey City, New Jersey. The development, designed by Handel Architects and developed by Kushner Real Estate Group, will consist of two residential towers — a 49-story, 560 ft (170 m) tower at 813 Pavonia Avenue and a 55-story, 620 ft (190 m) tower at 808 Pavonia Avenue. The towers will yield a combined 1,189 rental units. The development will also feature a 6,194 sq ft (575.4 m^{2}) art gallery, a cafe, and a series of public plazas, with Melillo Bauer Carman serving as the landscape architect.

== History ==
In October 2016, the city council approved zoning changes to the Journal Square 2060 Redevelopment Plan to allow the development of an arts district in an alley behind the Loew's Jersey Theatre, which was at the time occupied by parking garages. The plan, known as the Zone 10 Arts District, was designed by Studio V Architecture and featured space for residential buildings, retail, and a pedestrian concourse. The plan allowed for two high-rise buildings in addition to multiple low-rise buildings, and zoning changes included height bonuses that would allow developers to increase the height of the two high rises if they included space in the development for art galleries, theaters, museums, and other cultural amenities. An additional bonus allowed height increases if developers made contributions to a public arts fund. Zoning also required any development to include public walkways to the Journal Square Transportation Center.

A proposal for the site was first released in March 2017. The Harwood family, which had owned the property since the 1920s, was listed as the developer. Studio V Architecture was listed as the main architect, and Thornton Tomasetti as the project engineer. The proposal featured plans for a 55-story tower with 591 residential units and a 49-story tower with 589 units. In addition to the towers, the proposal featured a landscaped promenade, 6,400 sq ft (590 m^{2}) of retail space, a black box theater, an amphitheater, and a 5,000 sq ft (460 m^{2}) museum. The plan was approved in June 2017, with the residential towers having been modified to have 57 and 51 stories, respectively. Groundbreaking was expected to start in 2019.

Renderings of the current project were first released in 2022, with the city council reviewing an initial proposal during a meeting in September 2022. The initial proposal included a clocktower and an amphitheater. The city council approved the proposal in October of that year. In 2024, Mayor Steve Fulop proposed a 30-year tax abatement for the project in exchange for space in the development to house the North American branch of the Centre Pompidou museum, which had previously been cancelled due to concerns about its financial viability. The abatement was approved by the city council in September 2024. In October 2024, Kushner acquired the project parcels for $48.5 million. Kushner also agreed to a $3.5 million contribution to the Journal Square Cultural Arts Fund in order to allow the towers to exceed the area's 37-story limit. In November of that year, Kushner secured $175 million in financing for phase one of the project, which includes the shorter tower at 813 Pavonia Avenue. As of October 2025, excavation is progressing for phase one of the development, and the project is expected to be completed in late 2027.
