= Bonifacio Global City =

Central business district in Taguig, Philippines

- Central business district
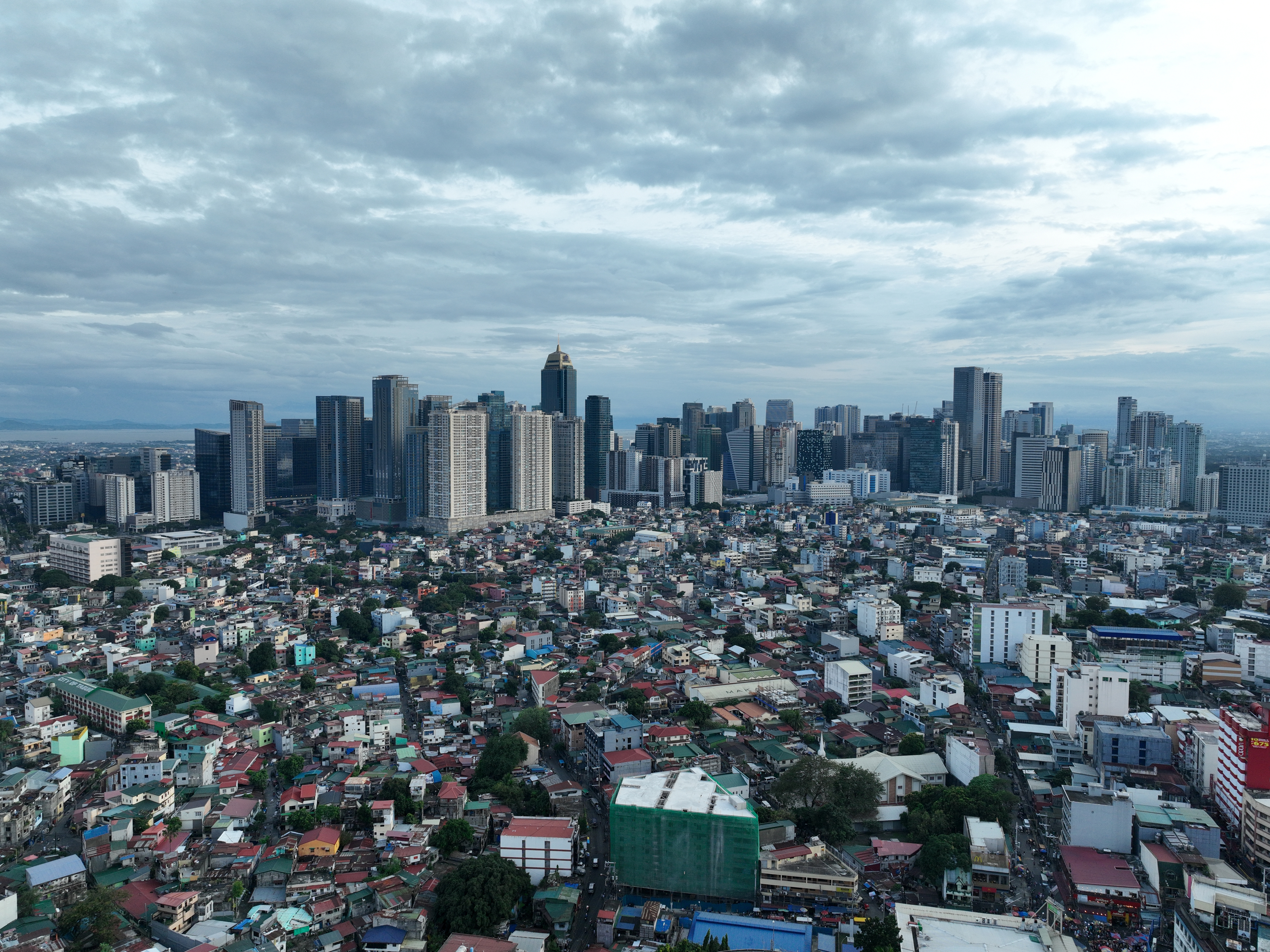
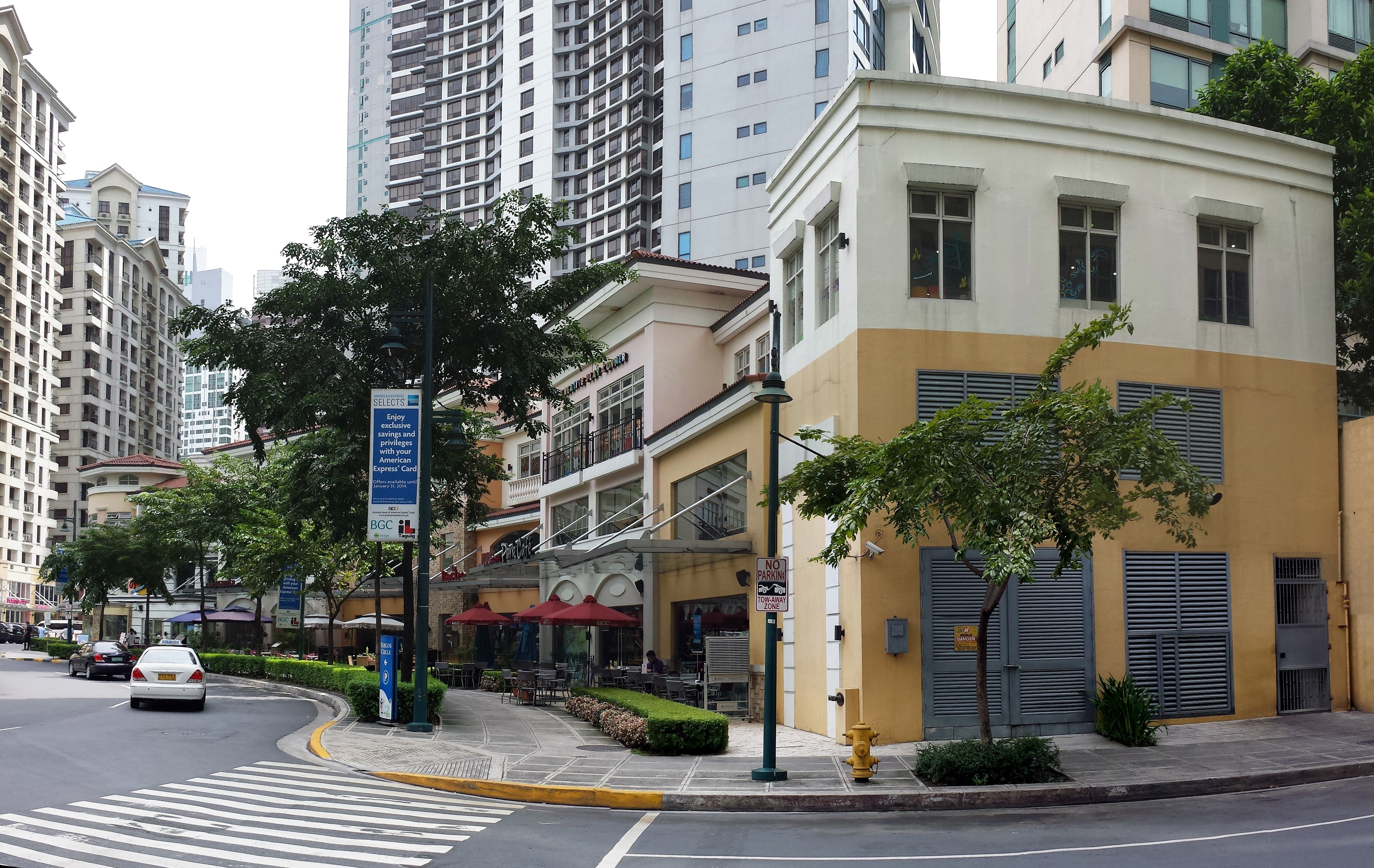
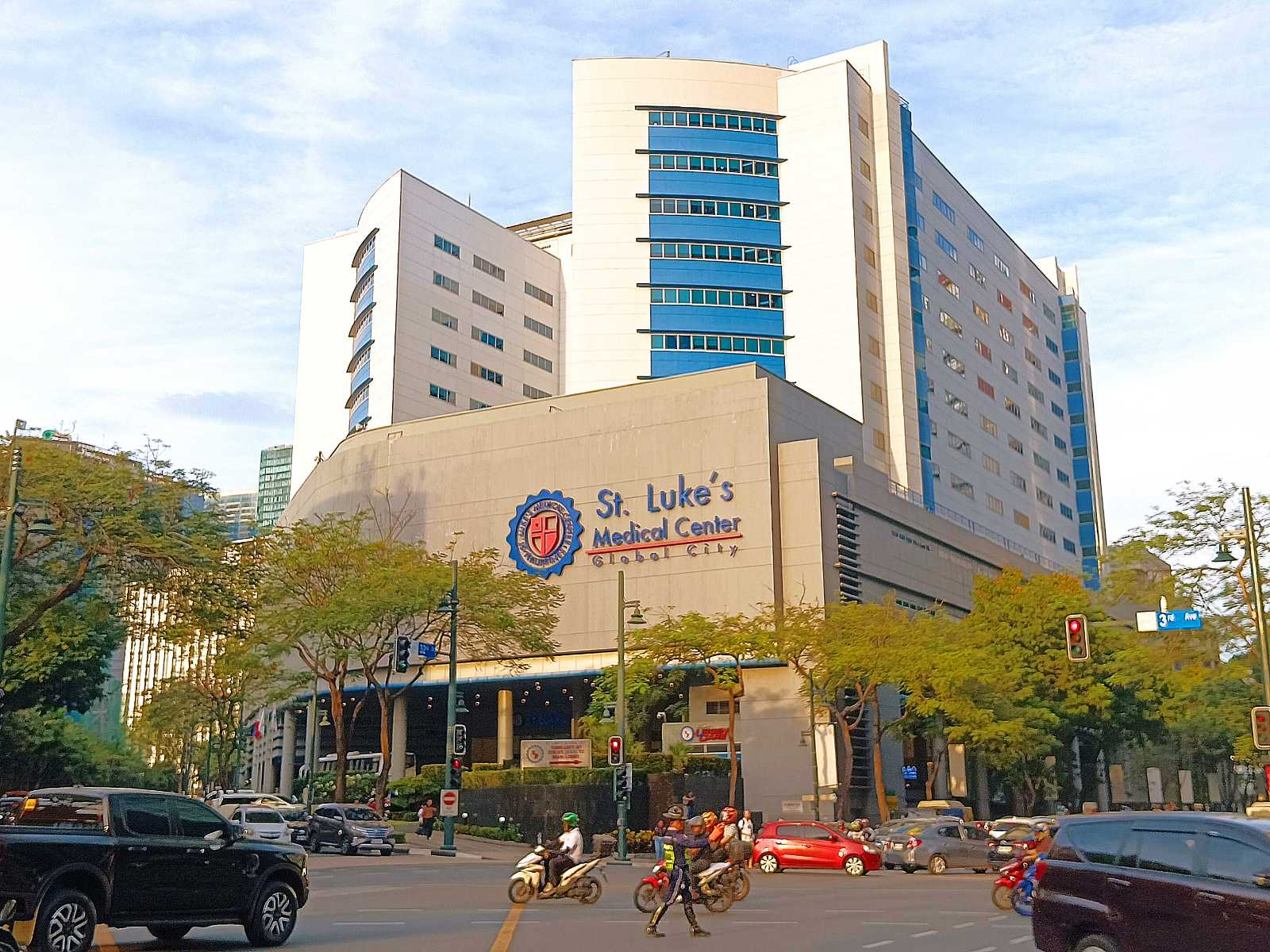
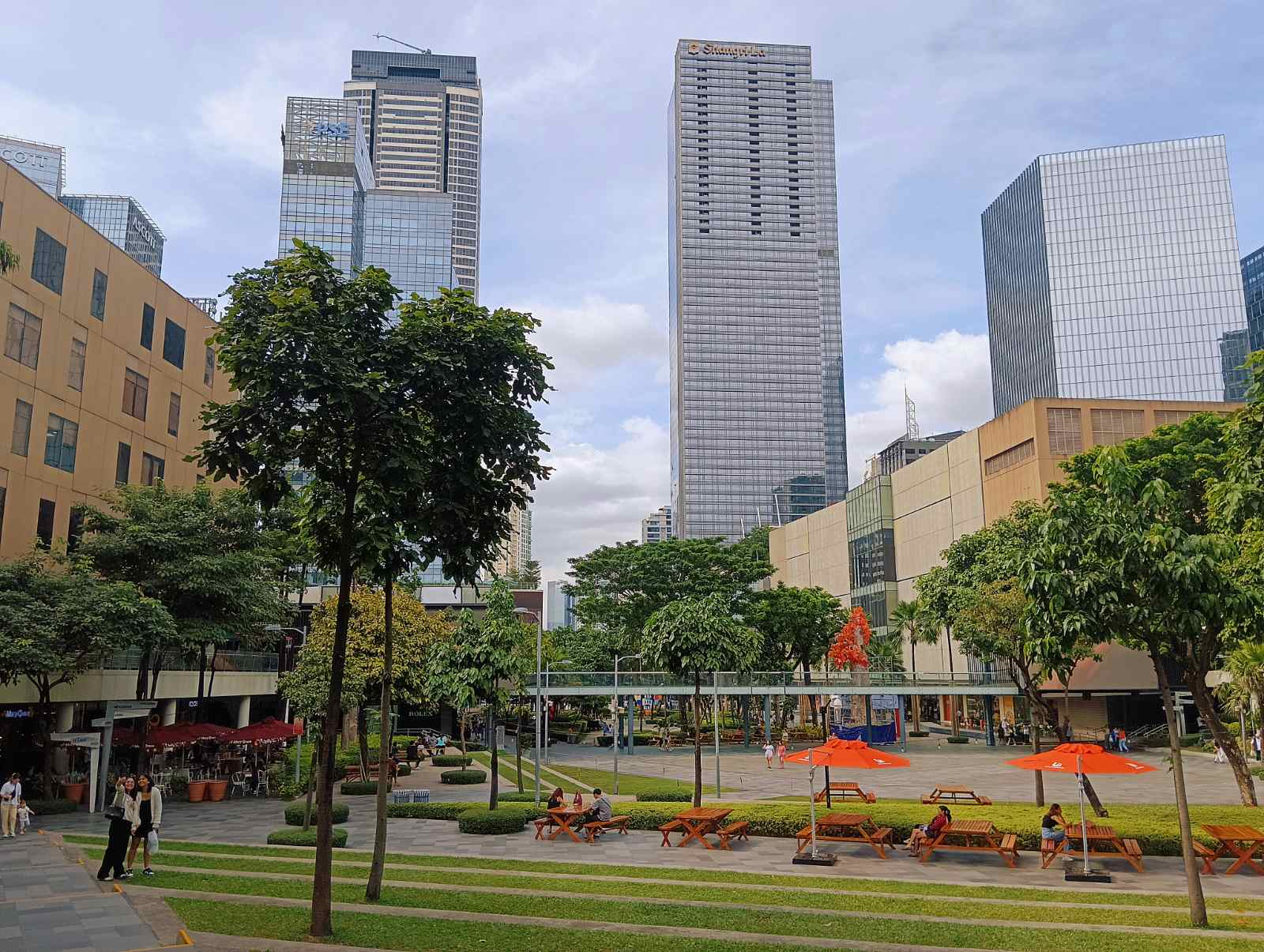
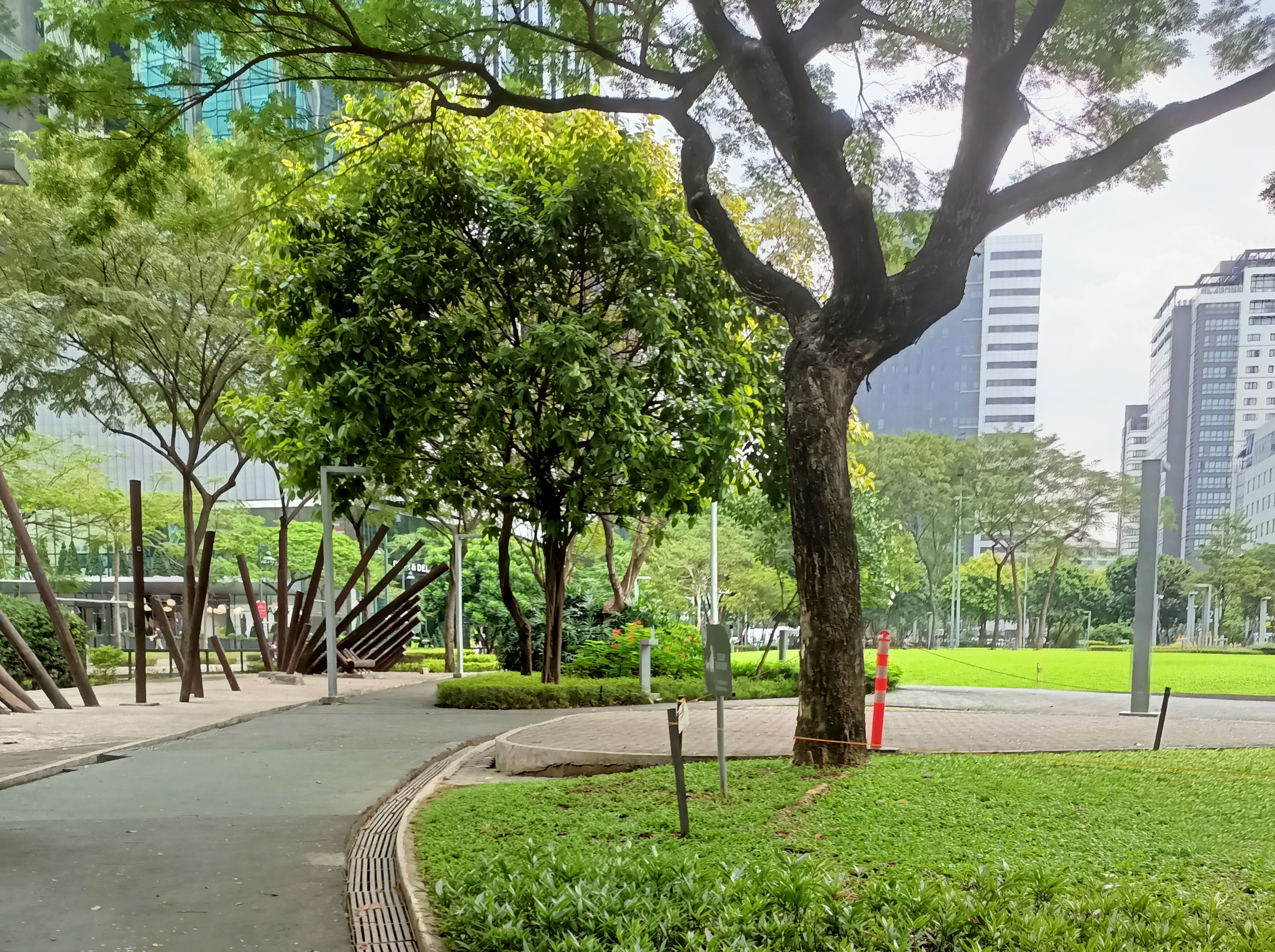
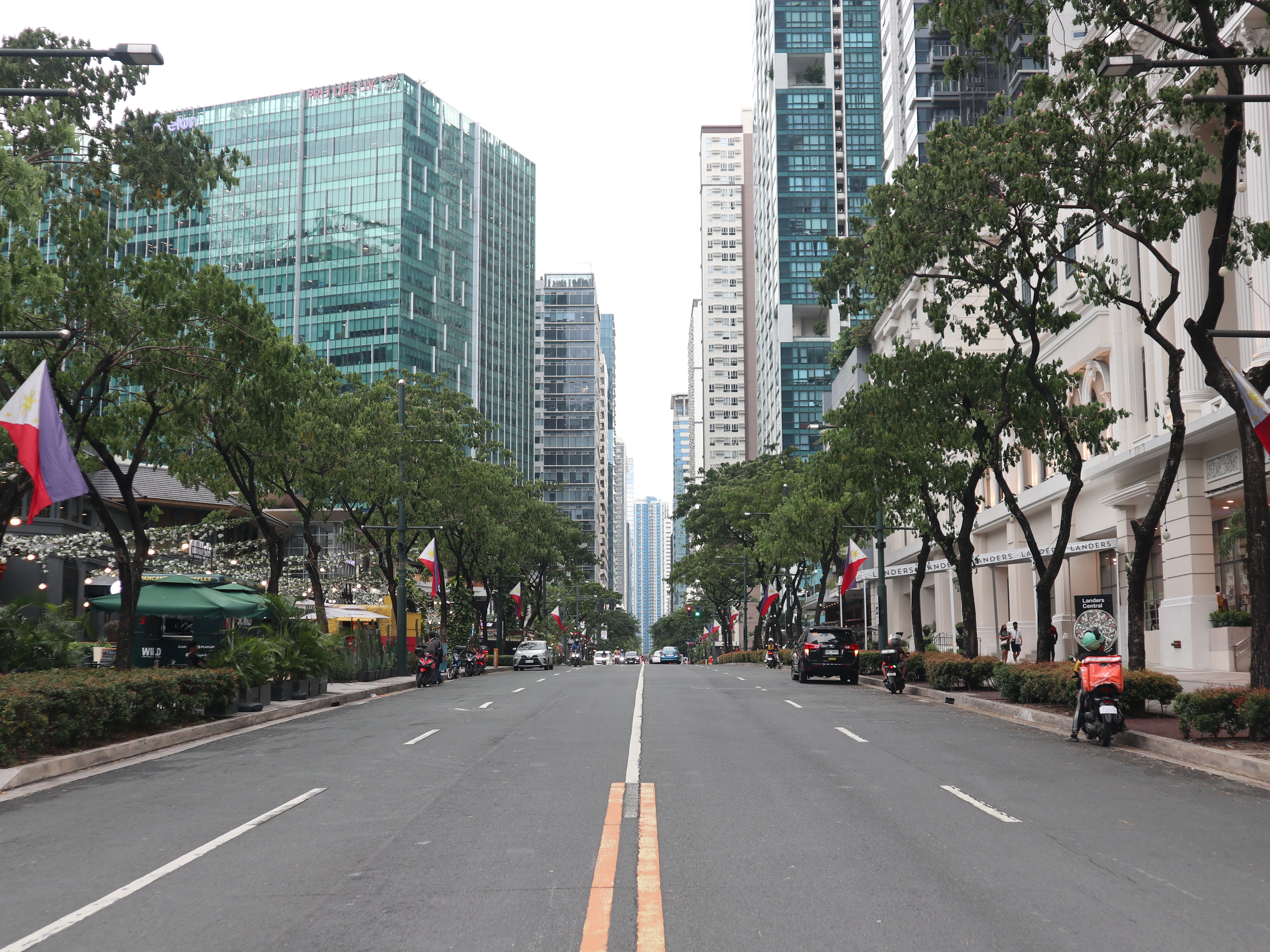
- From left to right: General skyline, Burgos Circle at the Forbes Town Center, St. Luke's Medical Center – Global City, Market! Market!, Bonifacio High Street, Philippine Stock Exchange, Track 30th Park, 11th Avenue, The Mind Museum

- Nicknames: BGC; Global City; Fort Bonifacio Global City; The Fort
- Bonifacio Global City within Taguig

- Location of Bonifacio Global City within Metro Manila
- Coordinates: 14°33′02.9″N 121°3′3.5″E
- Country: Philippines
- Region: National Capital Region
- City: Taguig
- Barangay: Fort Bonifacio,
- Established: February 7, 1995
- Named for: Andrés Bonifacio
- Elevation: 16.0 m (52.5 ft)
- Highest elevation: 40 m (130 ft)
- Time zone: UTC+8 (PHST)
- ZIP code: 1635
- Area code: 2
- Website: bgc.com.ph

Bonifacio Global City (BGC), also known as Global City or The Fort, is a 240-hectare mixed-use estate and central business district located in Fort Bonifacio, Taguig, Philippines. It is now the home of the Philippine Stock Exchange, the national stock exchange as well as several multinational corporations in the country. Some of the tallest buildings in the country are located in BGC such as the Metrobank Center, the country's tallest building. It experienced commercial growth following the sale of a 440 ha (1,100 acres) parcel of a military base by the Philippine government through the Bases Conversion and Development Authority (BCDA) during the administration of Fidel Ramos. BGC used to be a part of the main camp of the Philippine Army known as Fort Bonifacio. Translated in Filipino as Pangdaigdigang Lungsod ng Bonifacio (PLB), it is common locally to refer the district by its English name and abbreviation due to being branded as "the international business district of the Philippines".

In 1995, First Pacific-owned Metro Pacific Corporation-formed Bonifacio Land Corporation (BLC) started planning a major urban development—Bonifacio Global City under a joint venture with the BCDA called Fort Bonifacio Development Corporation (FBDC). The Ayala Corporation through Ayala Land, Inc., and Evergreen Holdings, Inc. of the Campos Group purchased a controlling stake in BLC from Metro Pacific in 2003. BCDA and the two companies currently control FBDC, which oversees the master planning & upkeep of the estate.

BGC was previously claimed by the City of Makati as part of its barangays Post Proper Northside and Post Proper Southside, the two Inner Fort barangays which are part of the Enlisted Men's Barrios (EMBO) barangays that were eventually transferred to Taguig in 2023. Pateros also claims the area as part of its territory.

== History ==
=== American years ===
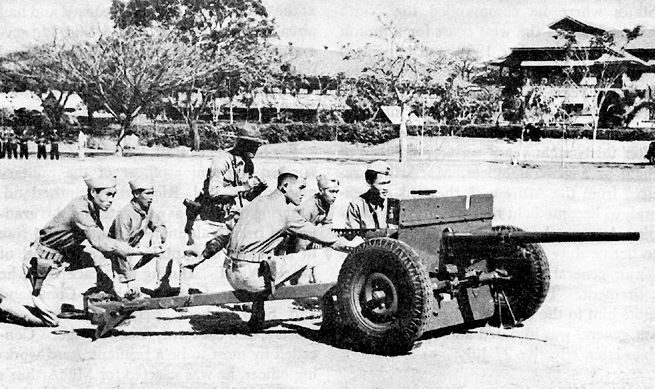
Philippine Scouts at Fort McKinley (called today Fort Bonifacio) firing a 37-mm antitank gun in training

During the American colonial period, the US government acquired a 25.78-square-kilometer (9.95 sq mi) property south of the Pasig River for military purposes. This area with a Transfer Certificate of Title (TCT) dated 1902, was turned into a camp known as Fort William McKinley after the 25th US president, William McKinley. After the Philippines gained its political independence from the United States on July 4, 1946, the US bestowed upon the newly independent country of the Philippines all rights of possession, jurisdiction, supervision, and control over the Philippine territory except the use of their military bases. On May 14, 1949, Fort McKinley was turned over to the Philippine government by virtue of US Embassy Note No. 0570.

=== Post-independence years ===
Under the Armed Forces of the Philippines leadership of Gen. Alfonso Arellano, Fort McKinley was made the permanent headquarters of the Philippine Army in 1957 and was subsequently renamed Fort Bonifacio, after the Father of the Philippine Revolution against Spain, Andrés Bonifacio, whose father, Santiago Bonifacio, was a native of Taguig. The Manila American Cemetery Park is in Bonifacio Global City, a holy and relaxing place that memorializes the Allied War Dead in the liberation of Asia against Imperial Japan.

=== The Martial Law era ===
When Ferdinand Marcos placed the Philippines under martial law in 1972, Fort Bonifacio became the host of three detention centers full of political prisoners - the Ipil Reception Center (sometimes called the Ipil Detention Center), a higher security facility called the Youth Rehabilitation Center (YRC), and the Maximum Security Unit where Senators Jose W. Diokno and Benigno Aquino Jr. were detained. Ipil was the largest prison facility for political prisoners during martial law. Among the prisoners held there were some of the country's leading academics, creative writers, journalists, and historians including Butch Dalisay, Ricky Lee, Bienvenido Lumbera, Jo Ann Maglipon, Ninotchka Rosca, Zeus Salazar, and William Henry Scott.

The YRC was a higher security prison which housed prominent society figures and media personalities, including society figures Tonypet and Enrique Araneta, Constitutional Commission delegate Manuel Martinez, poet Amado V. Hernandez, and Polytechnic University of the Philippines president Nemesio Prudente. After Fort Bonifacio was privatized, the area in which Ipil was located became the area near S&R and Home Depot, near 32nd Street and 8th Avenue in Bonifacio Global City, while the YRC became a government facility just outside of the business district.

=== Establishment of the BCDA ===
On March 19, 1992, President Corazon C. Aquino signed the Bases Conversion and Development Act of 1992 (Republic Act No. 7227) into law, creating the Bases Conversion and Development Authority (BCDA), tasked with converting Military Bases into "integrated developments, dynamic business centers and vibrant communities."

=== Privatization and early development ===
On June 7, 1994, President Fidel V. Ramos approved the privatization of the former military base for ₱20 billion. The following year, Metro Pacific Corporation (MPC) won a bid of $1.6 billion to undertake the conversion of 535 acres of undeveloped land into the country's newest commercial, business, and residential complex. MPC crushed the attempts of four other groups, which was $438 million higher than Ayala Land's bid of $1.2 billion.. Controversial journalist Rigoberto Tiglao has labelled the bid as "way too high" and thus narrated that such caused MPC's ultimate parent company, First Pacific to grapple the conglomerate from "keeling over".

On February 3, 1995, the BCDA and a consortium led by Metro Pacific Corporation formed a joint venture called the Fort Bonifacio Development Corporation (FBDC) for the purpose of developing 150 hectares (370 acres) of former Fort Bonifacio land. The private group bought a 55% stake in the FBDC for ₱30.4 billion, while BCDA held on to the remaining 45% stake. The FBDC's landmark project was conceived as Bonifacio Global City, a real estate development area meant to accommodate 250,000 residents and 500,000 daytime workers and visitors. In the same month, the Republic of the Philippines transferred 214 hectares of land in Fort Bonifacio to FBDC through Special Patent 3596.

Hellmuth, Obata, and Kassabaum (HOK), an American firm based in St. Louis and San Francisco, was appointed in 1996 to craft a master plan and designs to convert a 400-hectare former military base into a major urban center. The consultants are PROS, DCCD Engineering, TCGI, and W.B. Coscolluela & Associates. While the traffic and civil engineers led by Parsons Brinckerhoff (Asia) Ltd. In 1999, the government proposed the Government Center for Investments Complex, which is part of the development of the BGC and would have a cluster of four state-of-the-art medium-rise buildings that would become a one-stop shop for businesses and investors, and the BCDA signed an agreement with Mansour Establishment for Commerce and Development Projects, CAMS Asia Inc., and Bonifacio Business Center Inc. This plan would have housed the eight key government agencies but was not realized. The project was hampered by the 1997 Asian financial crisis, but moved forward when Ayala Land and Evergreen Holdings, Inc. of the Campos Group purchased Metro Pacific's controlling stake in FBDC on April 24, 2003.

Bonifacio Global City is part of Taguig's barangay Fort Bonifacio. Prior to the creation of such barangay in 2008, it was part of barangay Ususan.

=== Territorial dispute ===
On December 9, 1937, the Deed of Absolute Sale executed by the owner, Don Anacleto Madrigal Acopiado in favor of the American Government covering the area of 100 hectares (250 acres), portion of Bicutan, Taguig, annotated at the back of TCT No. 408. During the American Commonwealth, it was converted to a Military base, named Fort McKinley. It was during the presidency of President Ferdinand Marcos' administration when Fort McKinley was renamed Fort Bonifacio and transferred to Makati. Taguig got the jurisdiction over Fort Bonifacio after winning the case against Makati in filed in the Pasig Regional Trial Court in 1993. Makati appealed the ruling, but the Pasig RTC in 2011 still sided with Taguig, saying that Fort Bonifacio including the EMBO Barangays are all part of Taguig. Makati then asked the Court of Appeals to review the case. The Court of Appeals overturned the Pasig Regional Trial Court's decision and reverted jurisdiction of the BGC in favor of Makati. Taguig has filed a Motion of Reconsideration at the Court of Appeals seeking to revert the decision.

The newest Court of Appeals Resolution was promulgated on October 3, 2017. In an 18-page resolution promulgated on March 8 penned by Associate Justice Edwin Sorongon and was concurred by Justices Ramon Cruz and Renato Francisco, the CA's Special Former Sixth Division granted Taguig's motion to dismiss citing Makati's violation of the forum shopping rule (or pursuing simultaneous remedies in two different courts) and accordingly dismissed the latter's appeal of the earlier decision of the Pasig Regional Trial Court (RTC) which originally ruled in favor of Taguig.

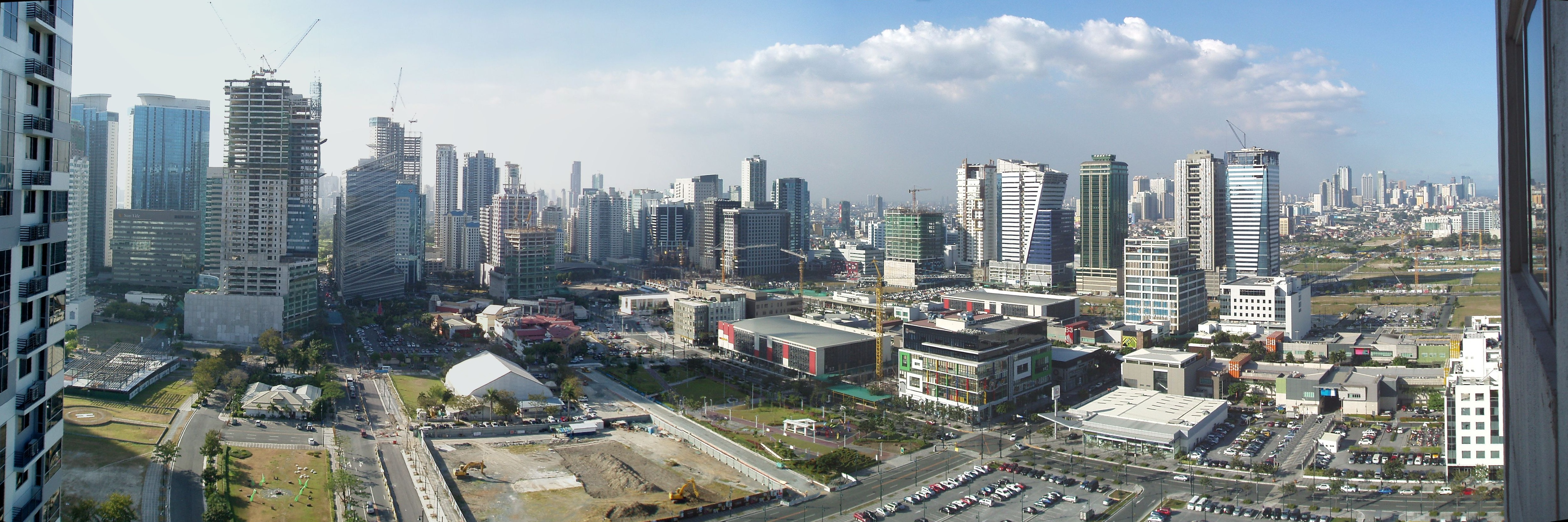
Bonifacio Global City in 2012

The CA took notice of the Supreme Court's decision on June 15, 2016, which found Makati guilty of "willful and deliberate forum shopping".

"However, the Supreme Court has not spoken. Ineluctably, we must adhere. The issue of whether Makati committed willful and deliberate forum shopping in these cases has been finally laid to rest no less than by the Supreme Court," the CA said in a ruling. With this development, the rightful owner of the former military reservation is Taguig.

In a decision dated December 1, 2021 and handed down on April 7, 2022, by Associate Justice Ricardo Rosario, the Supreme Court of the Philippines declared permanent the 1994 injunction issued by the Pasig City Regional Trial Court which disallowed the Makati City government "from exercising jurisdiction over, making improvements on, or otherwise treating as part of its territory Parcels 3 and 4, Psu 2031, comprising Fort Bonifacio, including the so-called Inner Fort comprising of Barangays Pembo, Comembo, Cembo, South Cembo, West Rembo, East Rembo and Pitogo." It was later affirmed in April 2023, when the Supreme Court junked the motion for reconsideration that was filed by Makati to finally side with Taguig.

== Description ==
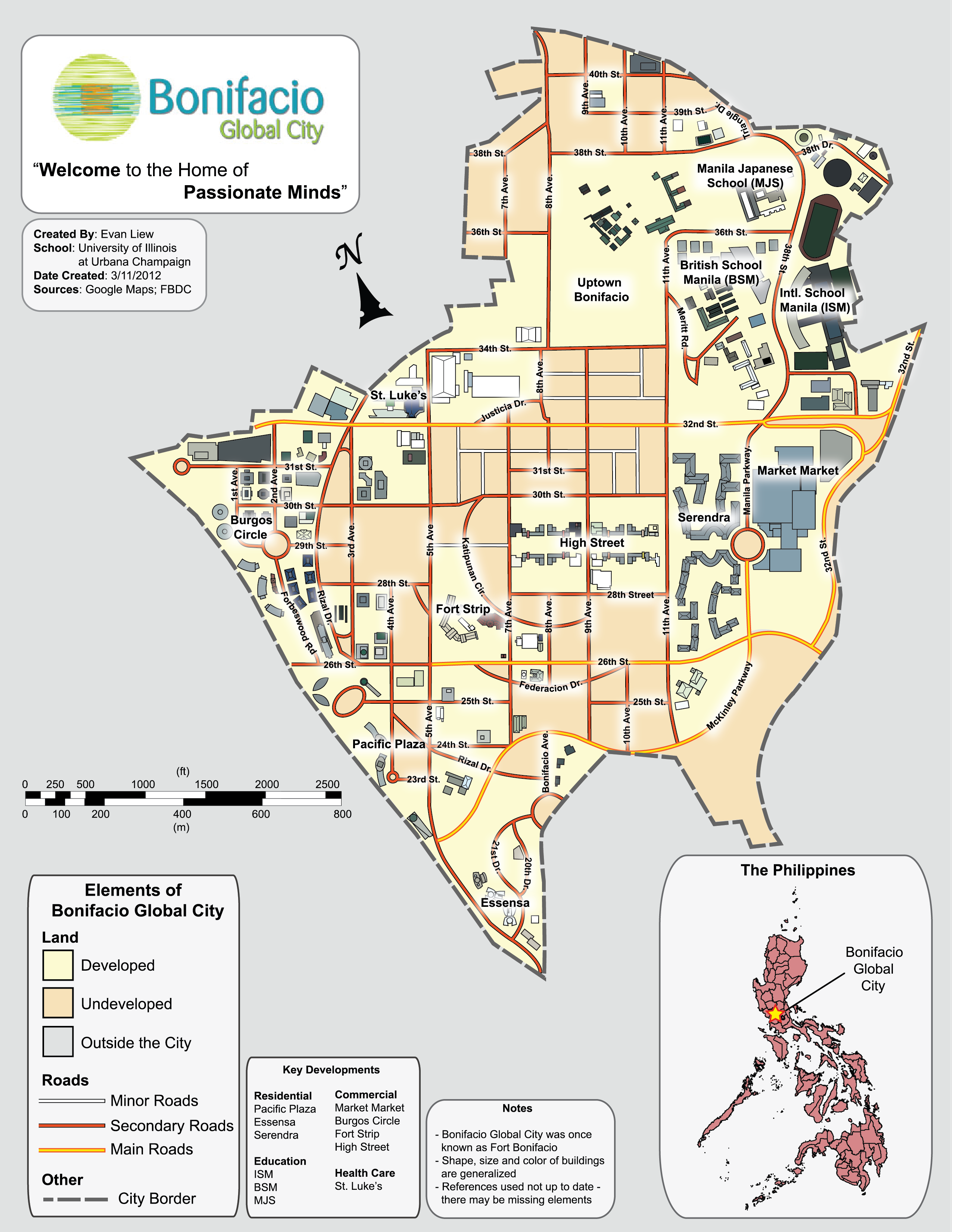
2012 Map of Bonifacio Global City.

Bonifacio Global City is between EDSA and the C-5 Road. There are seven major access points: access from the north and west through Kalayaan Avenue which connects it to the north gate and the Kalayaan Flyover, access from Taguig in the west via EDSA through McKinley Road and to the McKinley Gate; the three main entrances (Upper East Gate, Sampaguita Gate, and Lower East Gate) from C-5 in the east; and from the airport through the Villamor Airbase to the South Gate by 5th Avenue and Lawton Avenue. BGC and Ortigas Center has been connected by the Bonifacio Global City–Ortigas Link Bridge, with the southern end of the bridge at 8th Avenue.

BGC is home to residential condominiums, corporate office buildings, parks and mixed-use developments. Many Filipino and multinational corporations have acquired properties and have committed to relocate their global, regional or national headquarters to the business district.

== Developments ==
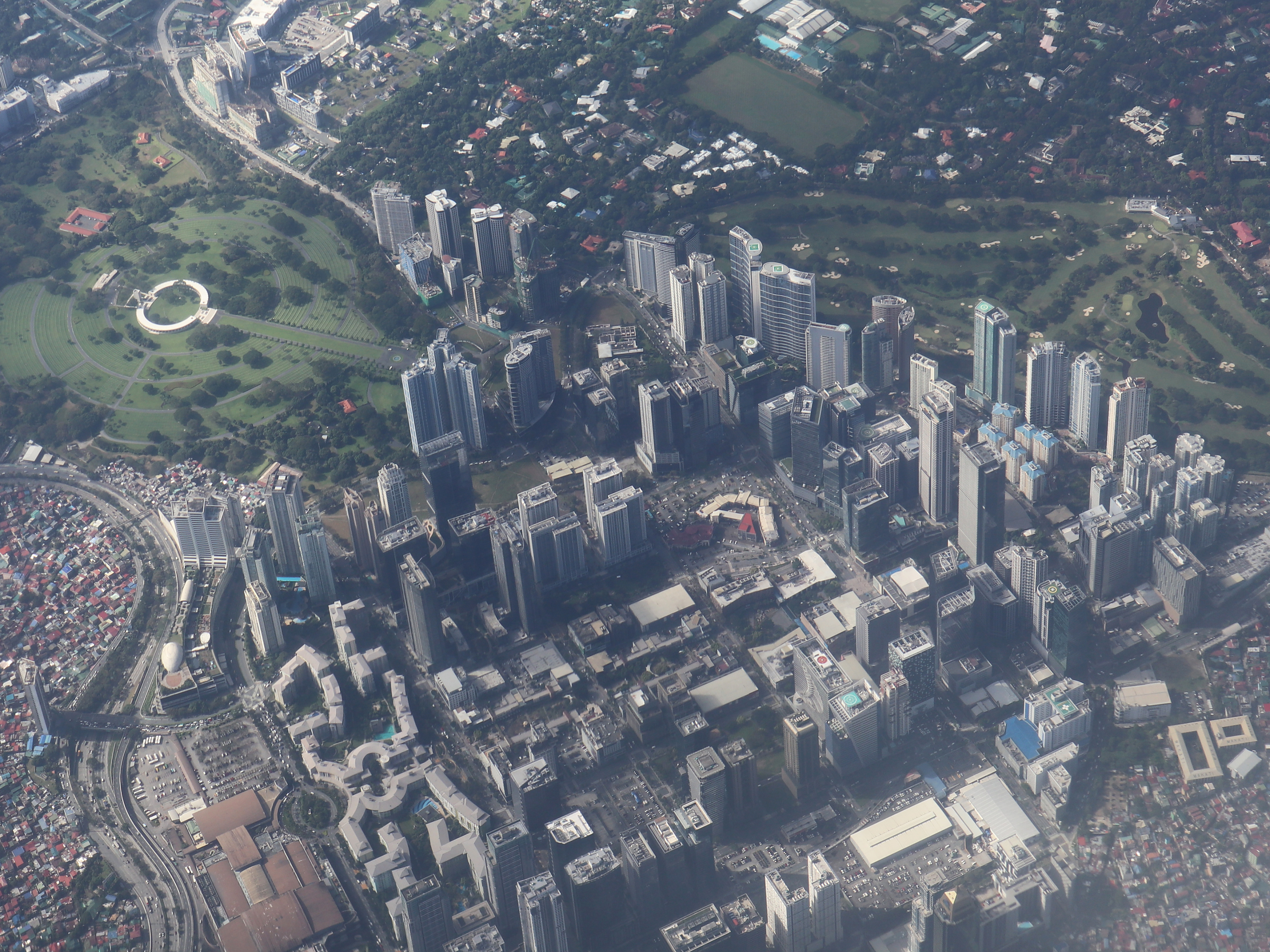
Bird's eye view of Bonifacio Global City

=== Bonifacio High Street ===
Bonifacio High Street forms the physical core of Bonifacio Global City and is designed as a three-by-three matrix of high-tech offices and residential buildings, retail outlets and pedestrian-friendly roads and walkways. The grid design ensures a city center that is easy to navigate. 5th and 11th Avenues and 32nd and 26th Streets serve as the boundaries of the city center. The Retail Promenade which encompasses 29th Street is characterized by landscaped areas. Its design concept is centered on an east–west central access with business establishments and activity pods. The promenade also offers retail at the ground level and offices at the second floor. The City Square Blocks feature landscaped areas and parks.

At One Bonifacio High Street is the PSE Tower, which houses the unified trading floor of the Philippine Stock Exchange, and the Shangri-La at the Fort, Manila. Across the 2.35-hectare (5.8-acre) high-end complex, the Ascott Bonifacio Global City Manila is also located within the vicinity.

Two urban parks, Track 30th and Terra 28th, are located on the north and south sides of the High Street respectively. Its amenities include a jogging path and several fitness oriented installations that can be used for exercises such as pull ups. The parks can be accessed through nearby bus stops.

=== Forbes Town Center ===
The Forbes Town Center is Megaworld's 5-hectare (12-acre) township community, where 8 Forbestown Road, Forbeswood Heights, Forbeswood Parklane, and Bellagio condominiums are located. It has a combination of low-density residential development, shopping strip, dining outlets, and other service facilities.

=== Grand Central Park ===
Grand Central Park (formerly Veritown Fort) is a 10-hectare (25-acre) New York-inspired mixed-use development located in the northern part of the district. One of the development's buildings is the 65-storey Metrobank Center which houses the Grand Hyatt Manila hotel and is currently the tallest building in Metro Manila and in the Philippines.

Other skyscrapers in the area include luxury residences such as Grand Hyatt Manila Residences, The Seasons Residences (a Japanese-themed community), and residential towers such as Park West, Park Avenue, Times Square West, Central Park West and Madison Park West. Additionally, Mitsukoshi BGC, which is the flagship store of Japan's oldest surviving department store chain, is also located in the area.

=== Uptown Bonifacio ===
Uptown Bonifacio is a 15-hectare (37-acre) property located in the northern part of the district, to the right of Grand Central Park. The area contains residential condominiums by Megaworld Corporation, namely Uptown Parksuites, Uptown Ritz, One Uptown Residence, and Uptown Arts Residence, with Uptown Modern on the way. The mixed-use business and commercial developments in the area cater to middle and upper class markets. The area is near the zone where the British, Japanese, and American international schools, and other local schools are located. Moreover, Megaworld Lifestyle Malls also built Uptown Mall and Uptown Parade in the area; Uptown Place Towers 1 to 3 are also built above the mall. Other office towers include the Worldwide Plaza (also known as the JPMorgan Chase Tower Manila), International Finance Center, World Commerce Place (also known as Uptown Eastgate), and Alliance Global Tower.

== Infrastructure, health and education ==
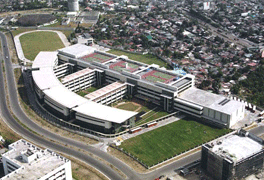
International School Manila

St. Luke's Medical Center, Inc. operates a hospital at Bonifacio Global City.

BGC has several major educational institutions, mostly located at the University Park district. The University of the Philippines System (through the constituent units of UP Diliman and UP Open University) and the De La Salle University – Rufino Campus, home to the Tañada-Diokno School of Law are two prominent universities which offer graduate programs for professionals working in the district. Other educational institutions in the area include the Leaders International Christian School of Manila, Chinese International School Manila, British School Manila, International School Manila, Manila Japanese School, Korean International School Philippines, Everest Academy Manila, STI College Global City, MGC-New Life Christian Academy - Global City, and Treston International College.

To prevent flooding, a massive detention tank is located underneath the Burgos Circle to store up to 22,000 cubic meters (780,000 cu ft) of rainwater before transferring it to a tributary of the Pasig River.

== Transport ==
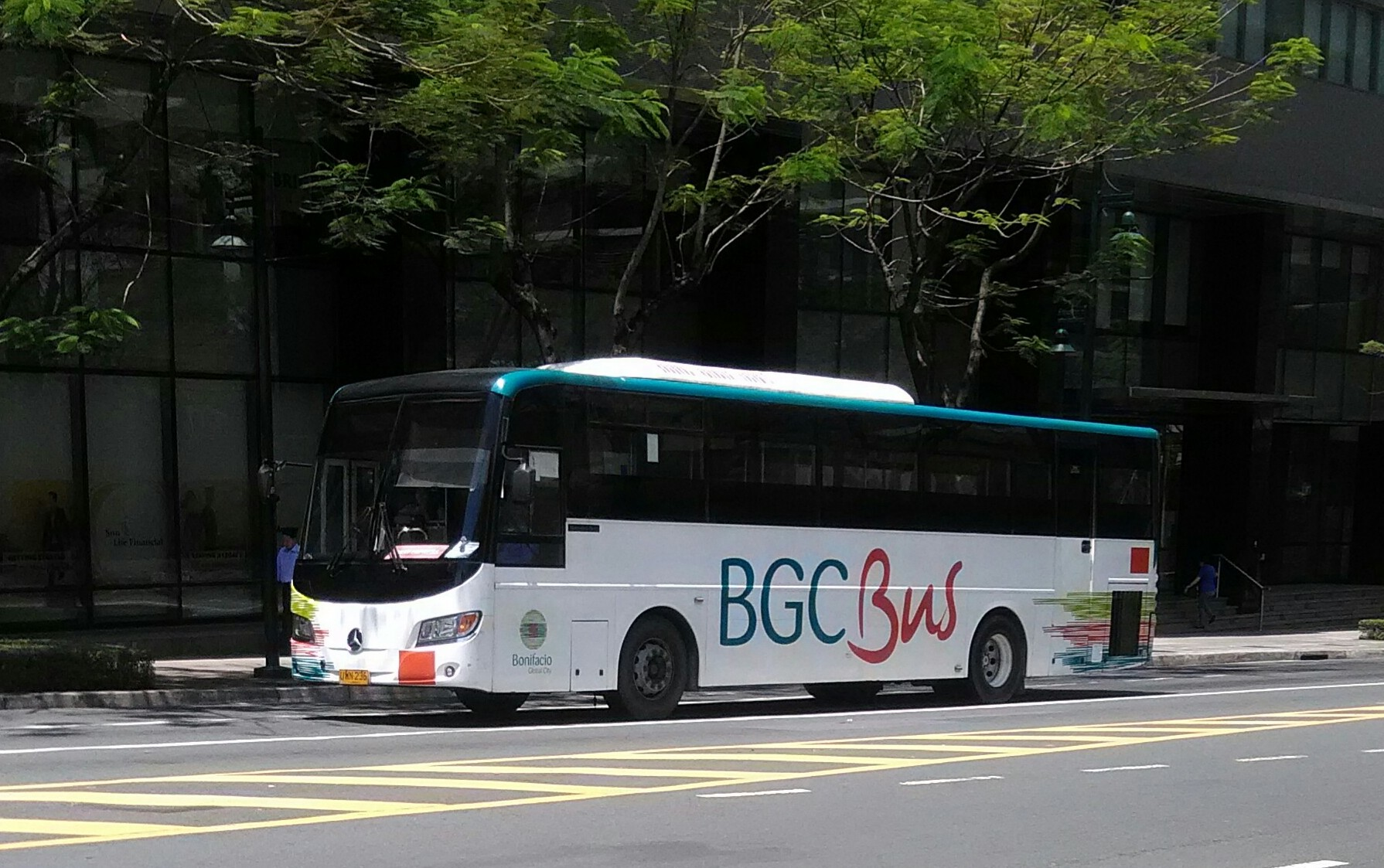
Bus operating under the BGC Bus system

Bonifacio Transport Corporation maintains bus routes (BGC Bus) serving the business district, as well as jeepneys, mini-buses, city buses, and UV Express, with a terminal located at the Market! Market! shopping mall and Uptown Bonifacio Transport Terminal.

The Land Transportation Franchising and Regulatory Board has launched new rationalized bus routes to the business district, from Parañaque Integrated Terminal Exchange, Pacita Complex in San Pedro, and Balibago in Santa Rosa. All buses, including those to and from out of the metropolis, are stationed at the Market! Market! terminal.

BGC is also indirectly served by the Guadalupe, Buendia, and Ayala stations of the MRT-3, which are connected to the development through jeepney and bus lines. Future direct rail connections to the city include the Bonifacio Global City Station and the Kalayaan Avenue Station under the Metro Manila Subway.

Citylink Coach Services provides a free transport option that takes commuters from Uptown Mall to Venice Grand Canal Mall (in Mckinley Hill), and vice versa.

== Gallery ==
Selection of places in Bonifacio Global City

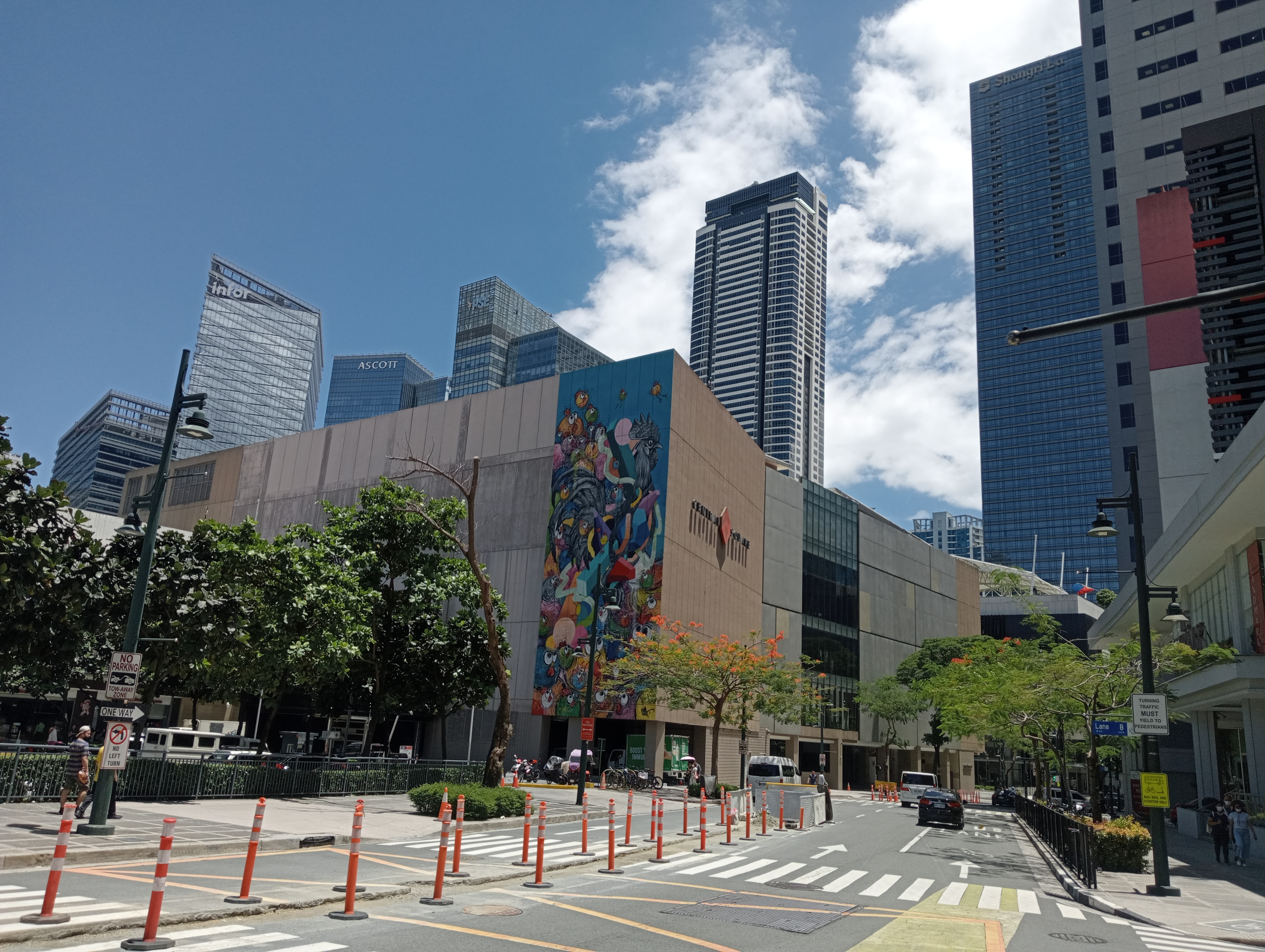
Central Square

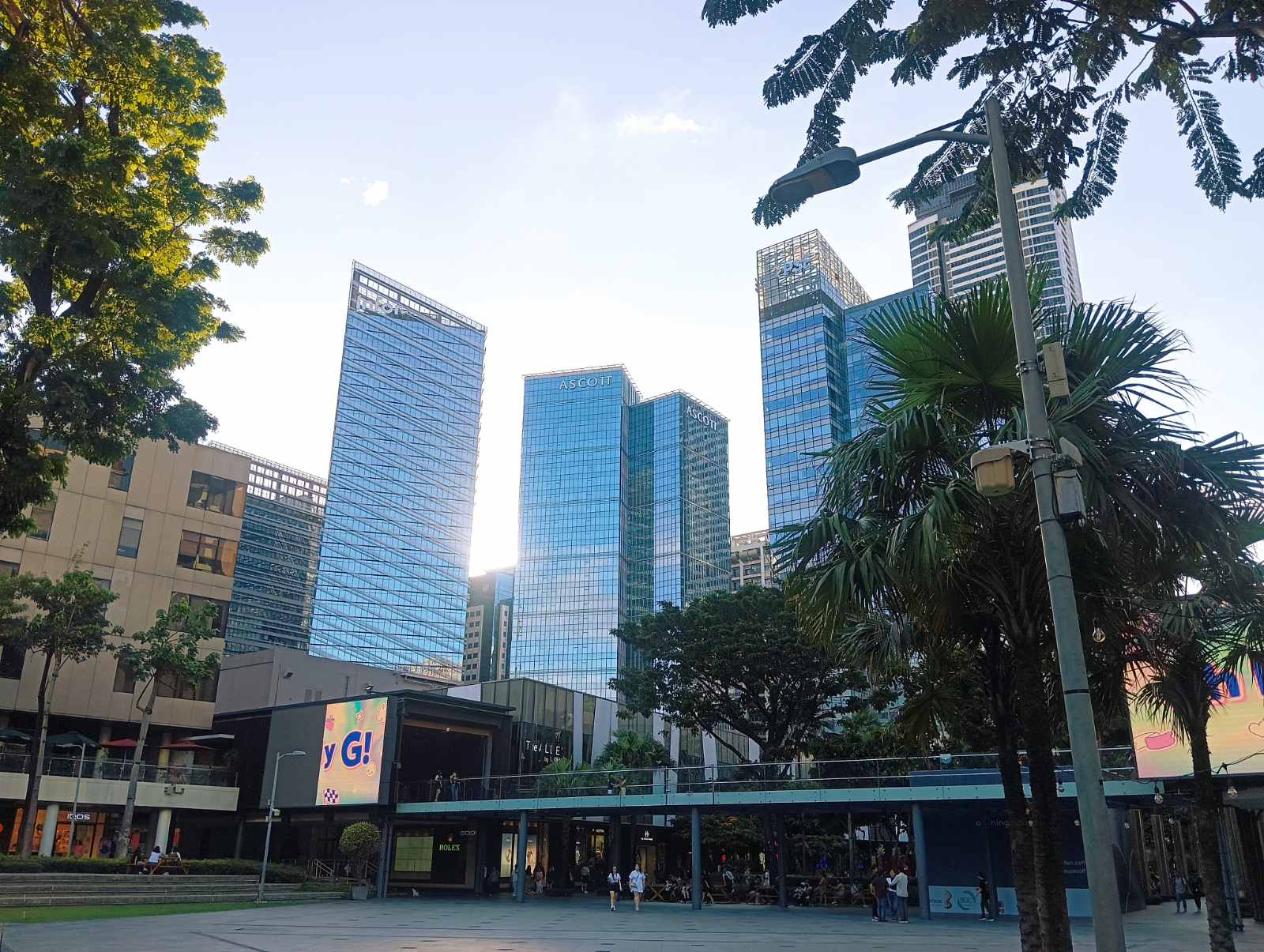
Skyline of BGC as seen from the amphitheater of Bonifacio High Street

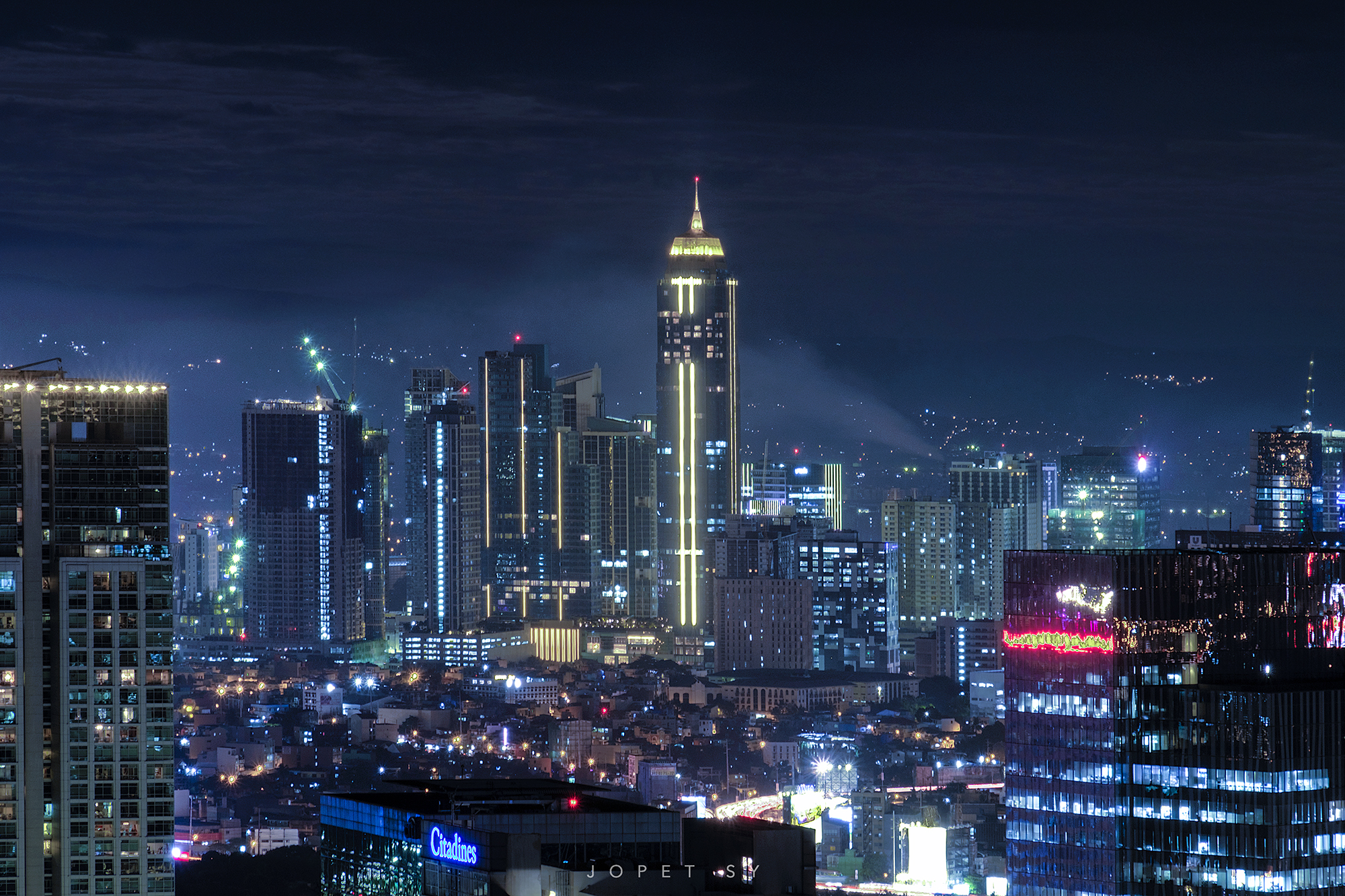
The Metrobank Center at night as seen from Makati City

Philippine Stock Exchange

Serendra condominiums

Metrobank Center

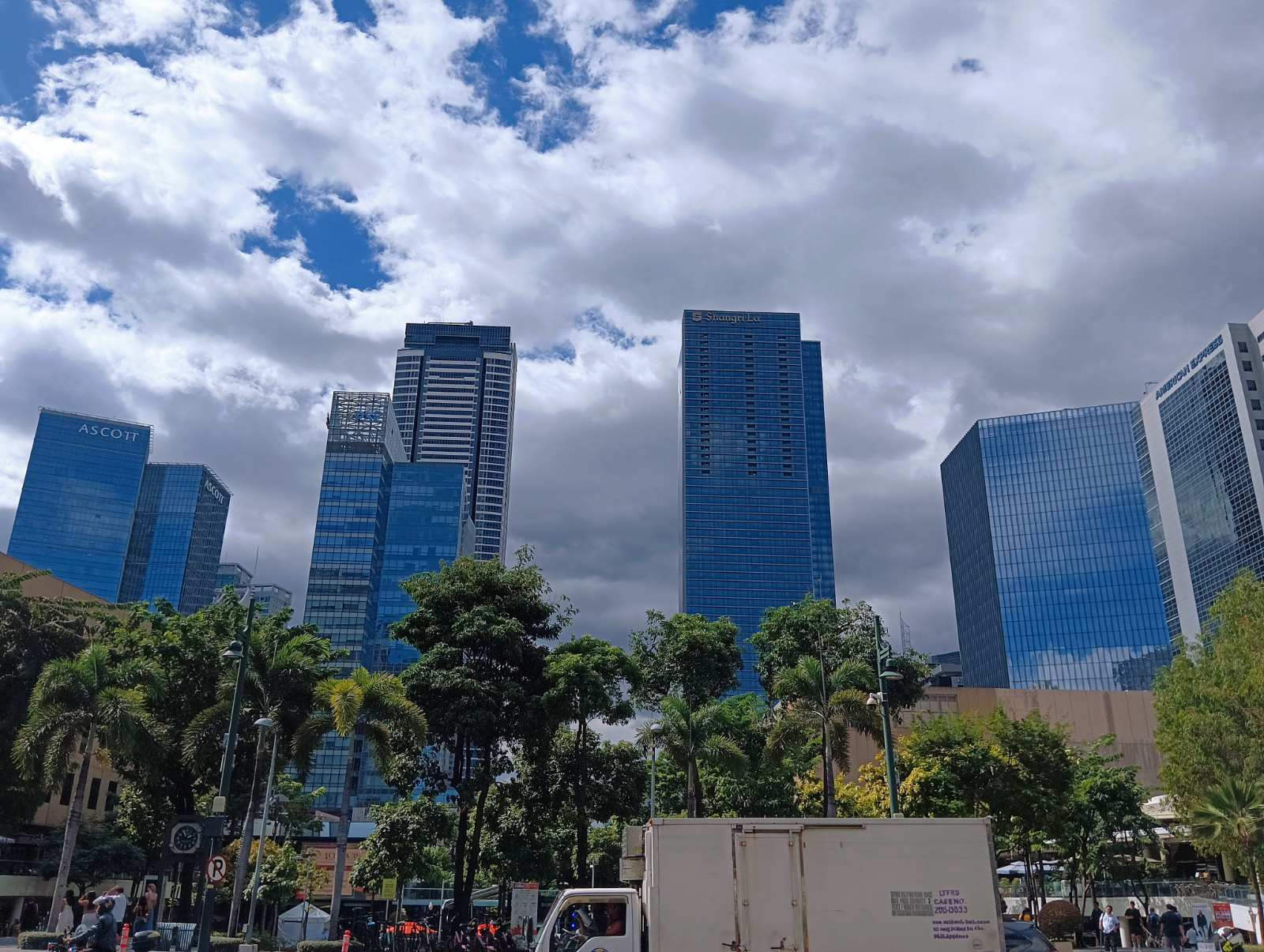
Bonifacio High Street from 7th Avenue

Victory Church Central Office and Victory BGC Congregation

== See also ==
- Filinvest City
- Ortigas Center
- Bonifacio Capital District
- Newport World Resorts
- Makati Central Business District
- Rockwell Center
- Clark Global City
- Transnational eGlobal
