= R. Donahue Peebles =

African American businessman

Don Peebles
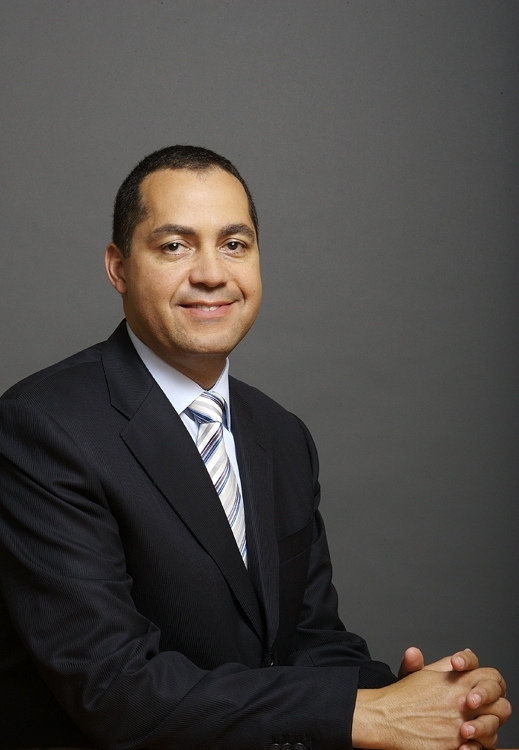
- Born: Roy Donahue Peebles; Washington, D.C., U.S.
- Education: High school graduate
- Title: Founder, Chairman and CEO of the Peebles Corporation
- Website: Official website

Roy Donahue "Don" Peebles is an American real estate entrepreneur. He is the founder, chairman, and chief executive officer of the Peebles Corporation, a privately held real estate investment and development company established in 1983. The firm focuses on public/private partnerships and luxury commercial and residential developments in major U.S. cities including New York, Washington, D.C., Los Angeles, and Miami.

== Early life and education ==
Peebles was born in Washington, D.C. to Ruth Yvonne Willoughby and Roy Donahue Peebles, Sr. Peebles and his mother, a real estate professional, relocated to Detroit, MI when he was eight years old. At the age of 13, Peebles and his mother returned to DC where he completed high school at The Congressional Page High School while serving as a congressional page in the House of Representatives on Capitol Hill. During this time, he was an intern for two members of Congress and also worked as a staff aide for another Congressional member. He attended Rutgers University in Newark, New Jersey where he studied pre-medicine while working part-time for his uncle as well as in the office of Peter Rodino. He left after his freshman year to pursue a career in real estate.

== Career ==
On January 9, 1983, at the age of 23, Peebles opened his own residential and commercial real estate appraisal firm. Later that year, Mayor Marion Barry appointed him to Washington's real estate tax appeals board, the Board of Equalization and Review, now known as the Board of Real Property Assessments and Appeals. The following year, Mayor Barry appointed him Chairperson of the board where he served until 1988. In 1986, a Peebles-led partnership acquired the site for his first commercial real estate development project.

Through a Public-Private Partnership (PPP) with the District of Columbia, Peebles delivered his first Class A building in 1989.

In 1990, Peebles founded RDP Assessment Appeals Services, a Washington-based commercial tax assessment appeals firm. He continued to acquire commercial buildings and development sites, primarily through PPPs in Washington, D.C. throughout the 1990s, including 10 G Street NE, 59 M Street, and the Courtyard by Marriott Convention Center Hotel. In 1996, Peebles won the development rights to the 1930s Royal Palm Hotel in Miami Beach. This landmark deal distinguished Peebles as the nation's first African American to own and develop a major hotel. He sold The Royal Palm Hotel in December 2004 for $127.5 million.

In 1999, Peebles purchased The Bath Club in Miami, an exclusive social club opened in 1926, after becoming the first black member in 1996. Peebles built a luxury residential tower on the site of the club's former parking lot and tennis courts and preserved the historic clubhouse. The project was completed in 2005. The Bath Club site expands 5 acres, plus 3 acres of beach, including 540 feet of beachfront along the Atlantic Ocean, as well as 20,000 feet of indoor and outdoor private event space, a spa, a fitness center, two clay tennis courts, and a fine dining restaurant-lounge.

== Politics and affiliations ==
Peebles has been politically engaged since the 1970s. He served on President Bill Clinton's national finance committee during the 1992 presidential race, joined his Economic Summit in Arkansas that same year, and has hosted President Clinton at his homes on several occasions. He was a member of President Barack Obama's National Finance Committee for the President's 2008 election and his 2012 reelection campaign. In May 2008, Peebles hosted then Senator Obama for a campaign fundraiser at The Bath Club in Miami Beach and later hosted President Obama at the Peebles' home in Washington, D.C. for a campaign fundraiser on August 8, 2011.

In 2010, he announced that he had considered running to become mayor of Washington, but he decided against it due to his mother-in-law's terminal illness. He had also publicly considered running for Mayor of New York City.

In 2013, he was elected vice chairman of the board of directors of the Congressional Black Caucus Foundation. In July 2015, he was elevated to chairperson of the CBCF's board of directors and re-elected in February 2016, a role he held until February 2017. Peebles is the only non-member of Congress to be elected to the position of Chairperson of the CBCF.

In 2014, according to Peebles, Mayor DeBlasio contacted Peebles for a $20,000 donation to support the mayor's universal pre-K program, UPKNYC, which is now shut down. That same year, a Peebles-led team responded to an RFP to redevelop Long Island Community Hospital. SUNY Downstate Medical Center ended talks with Peebles over an impasse about remediation costs on May 28, 2014 and later made a deal with Fortis Property Group. According to media reports, the Peebles team's proposal was ranked higher than that of Fortis.

As an advocate for economic empowerment, Peebles and his wife, Katrina Peebles, have supported both parties, in various congressional, mayoral, gubernatorial, and presidential elections over the years. He supports small business and minority-focused initiatives emerging from The White House with a focus on policy change rather than political affiliation.

== Bibliography ==
- The Peebles Principles: Tales and Tactics from an Entrepreneur's Life of Winning Deals, Succeeding in Business, and Creating a Fortune from Scratch. R. Donahue Peebles with J. P. Faber. John Wiley and Sons (2007). ISBN 0-470-09930-5.
- The Peebles Path to Real Estate Wealth: How to Make Money in Any Market. R. Donahue Peebles with J. P. Faber. John Wiley and Sons (2008). ISBN 0-470-37280-X.

== Personal life ==
As of 2011, Peebles lives in Miami Beach, Florida, Sag Harbor, NY and New York City with his wife Katrina, a former PR executive, whom he married in 1992. She is an interior designer and serves as the creative director and principal of The Peebles Corporation. Peebles' son is a Columbia University graduate and is currently working at The Peebles Corporation. His daughter is a national hunt seat equestrian competitor.

Peebles holds Honorary Doctorates from Johnson & Wales University and Sojourner Douglass University
