= Peebles Corporation =

Real estate investment and development company

- Type: Private
- Industry: Real estate investment and development
- Founded: 1983
- Headquarters: Miami Beach, Florida
- Key people: R. Donahue Peebles (Founder, Chairman and CEO)
- Website: peeblescorp.com

Peebles Corporation is a privately held real estate investment and development company led by Roy Donahue Peebles. Headquartered in Miami Beach, with offices in New York and Washington, DC, the company was founded by Peebles in 1983. The company specializes in residential, hospitality, retail, and mixed-use commercial properties, with a focus on public-private partnerships.

== History ==
The Peebles Corporation was founded in 1983 by R. Donahue Peebles. As per media reports, it is one of the largest black-owned development corporations in the United States. In 1986, the company acquired the rights to develop a 100,000-square-foot office building at 2100 Martin Luther King Jr. Avenue SE in the Anacostia neighborhood of Washington, D.C. Completed in 1989, it was the company's first development project. It continued to acquire commercial buildings and development sites in Washington, D.C. throughout the 1990s, including 10 G Street NE and the Courtyard by Marriott Convention Center Hotel. The Courtyard was the first hotel acquired by Peebles.

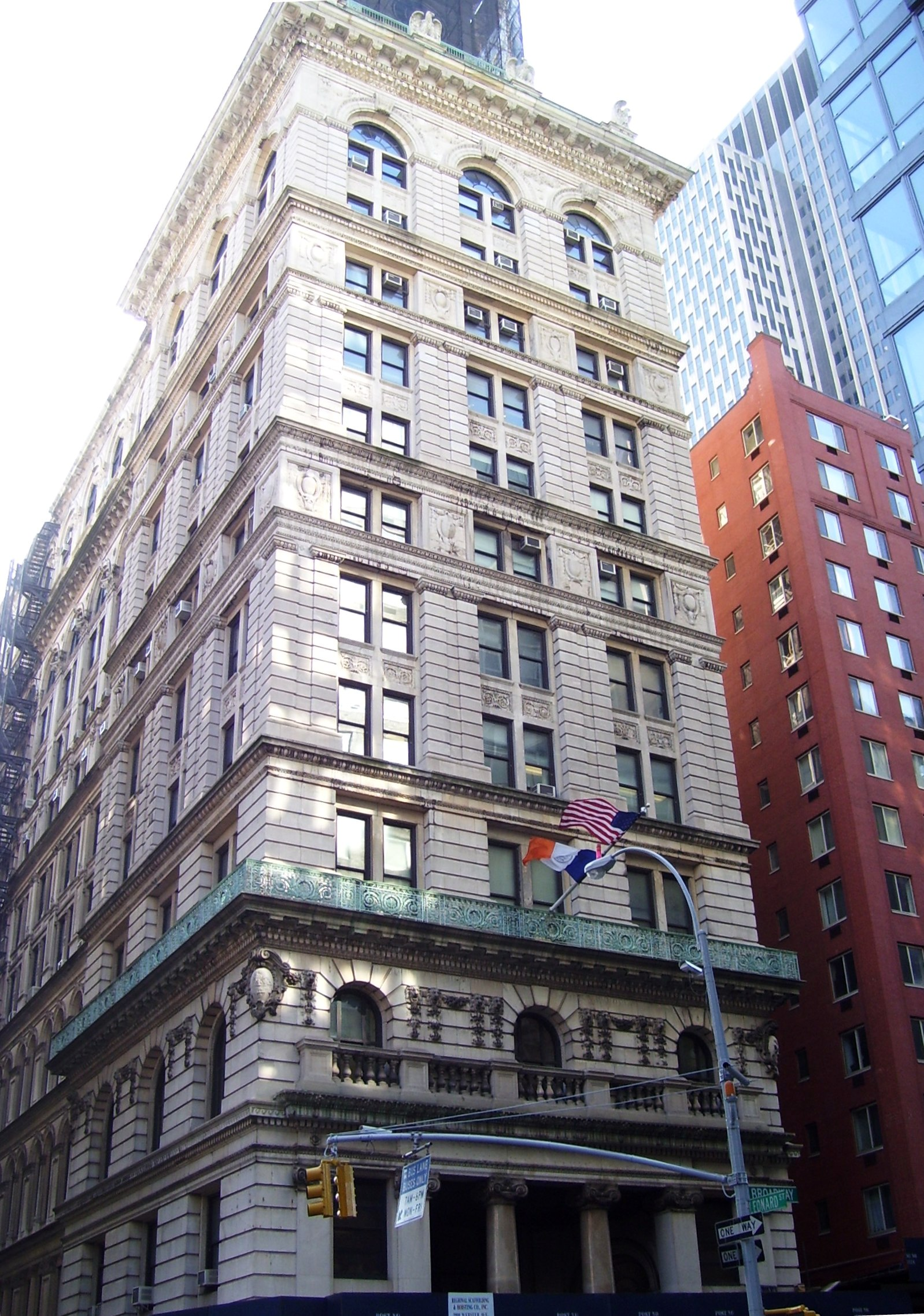
108 Leonard, formerly the New York Life Insurance Company Building, purchased by Peebles Corporation in 2013 and renovated it for residential use.

In 1996, the Peebles Corporation won the development rights to the Royal Palm Hotel in Miami Beach, Florida. The property was expanded with the purchase of the neighboring Shorecrest Hotel, with Peebles building two new 17-story towers for a total of 422 rooms. Completed in 2002, the Royal Palm Resort became the nation's first Black-owned luxury resort. Peebles sold the property in 2005, but regained management control in 2009 along with 12.5 percent ownership stake. The hotel was purchased by Sunstone Hotel Investors in 2010 at foreclosure auction.

In 1997, Peebles Corporation took over a deal to build a hotel at the Broward County Convention Center. After four years of negotiations, Peebles was unable to come to terms with the county and filed a lawsuit against the county for costs. The litigation continued until 2012 when a court ruled against Peebles. In 1998, Peebles Corporation acquired The Bath Club, a private beach club in Miami Beach, Florida. The Bath Club historically excluded blacks, Jews, and Hispanics from the property prior to R. Donahue Peebles becoming the first black member in 1996. It expanded the property to include a 20-story tower on the property known as Residences at Bath Club which opened in 2005. The expansion also included six oceanfront villas. It also spent $8 million to renovate the club itself, re-opening in 2021.

Peebles acquired the 87-acre Pacifica’s Rockaway Quarry for $7.5 million in 2005, with plans of building a mixed-use center with housing, hotel and retail. The project was not approved by voters in 2006 and the property was later put up for sale. The Peebles Corporation formed a joint venture with MGM Grand and Harbinger Capital in 2010 to enter into gaming, bidding on the development of the Aqueduct Racetrack. Despite being considered a potentially successful candidate, the project was ultimately awarded to the Aqueduct Entertainment Group.

In 2013, Peebles acquired the former New York Life Insurance headquarters building at 108 Leonard in Manhattan via public RFP for $160 million. It was purchased along with El-Ad Group and was the most expensive property to be sold by the New York City government. Following various legal issues and delays, the first condominiums in the 400,000-square-foot redevelopment were sold in March 2018.

In 2015, Peebles was selected to develop a site known as Brooklyn Village in Uptown Charlotte. It secured funding from Stonehill Strategic Partners for Phase 1 of the development in August 2023 with construction start anticipated in 2025. Development plans were revised in 2025 to include more affordable housing with construction delayed until 2026. In May 2026, Peebles Corporation turned over the deed to the property to Peachtree Group in lieu of foreclosure.

In December 2017, Peebles Corporation, as part of the three-team development partnership Angels Landing Partners, was approved to redevelop the Bunker Hill site in Downtown Los Angeles, dubbed Angels Landing. The estimated $1.2 billion development would include residential, hotel, retail, and communal spaces distributed over two towers. In February 2024, the city terminated the agreement with Angels Landing. In January 2025, Peebles and MacFarlane filed a lawsuit against the City of Los Angeles for allegedly unlawfully terminating their contract, seeking to recover $20 million they invested.

The Peebles Corporation submitted an RFP to the City of New York in 2021 to build the Affirmation Tower, the tallest proposed in the Western Hemisphere. As a result of the transition from the administration of Governor Andrew Cuomo to Governor Kathy Hochul, the state cancelled all project solicitations in December 2021.

== Philanthropy & community involvement ==
The Peebles Corporation works with local organizations in the communities in which they build projects. In 1998, the company founded the Entrepreneurship Academy at The Hospitality High School in Washington, DC. The company also helped build CARE Elementary in Miami in one of the most underserved communities in the city. Peebles works with the Milken Institute to support various initiatives with both the Prostate Cancer Foundation and global leadership.

In 2019, Peebles launched Peebles Emerging Developer Fund, a $500 million investment fund for women and minority developers in New York, Los Angeles and South Florida. The fund has been trying to attract investors and deploy capital, but has encountered difficulties as it is focusing on public employment pension funds who have been hesitant. Peebles initially wanted to begin investing in by the end of 2020. As of 2022, the fund is raising capital to its new target, $450 million.
