= Burgos Circle =

Traffic circle in Manila, Philippines

- Padre Burgos Circle
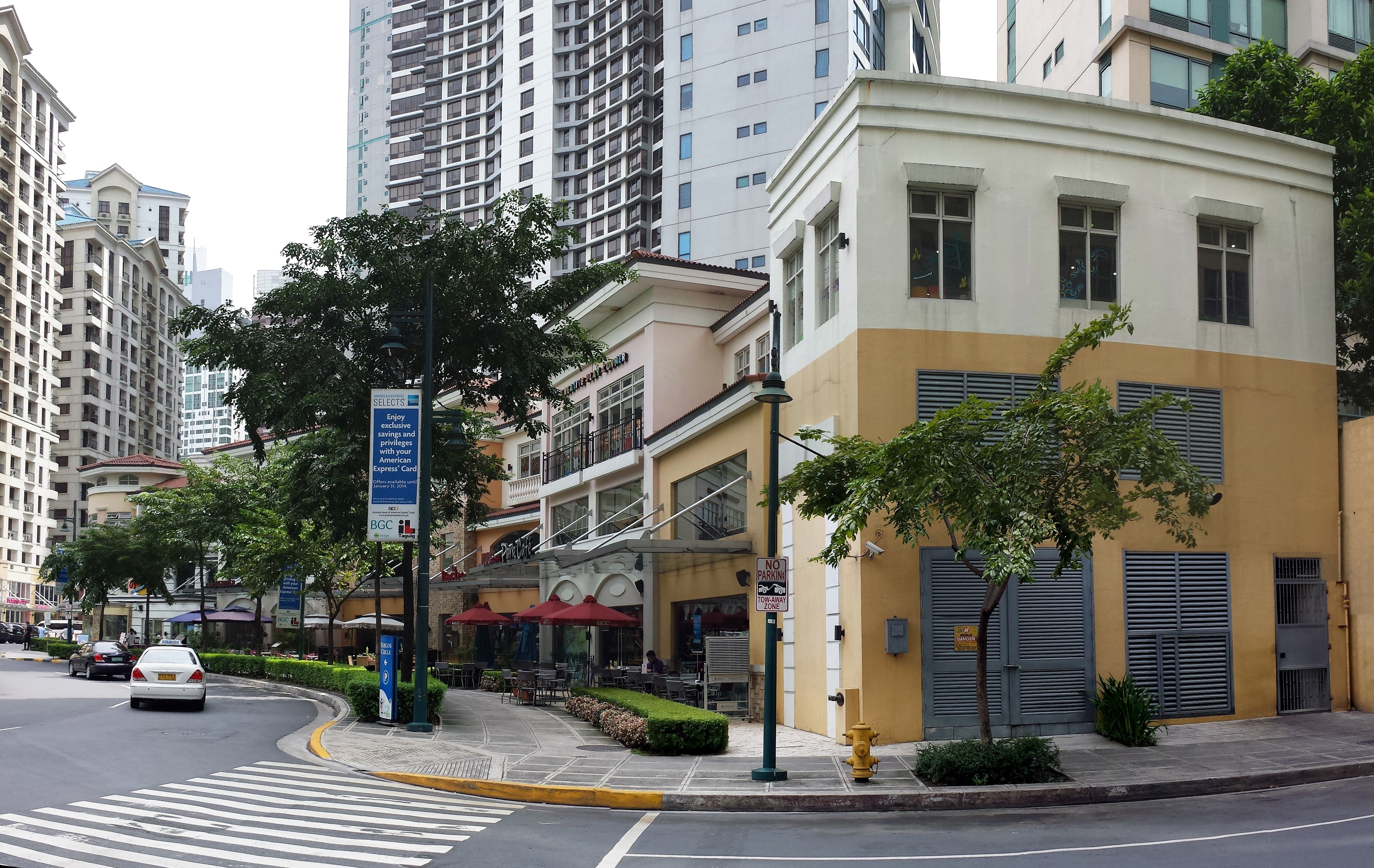
- Interactive map of Burgos Circle

Location
- Bonifacio Global City, Taguig, Metro Manila, Philippines
- Coordinates: 14°33′9.8″N 121°2′39.7″E
- Roads at junction: Forbestown Road; 1st Avenue; 2nd Avenue; 29th Street

Construction
- Type: Traffic circle
- Maintained by: Fort Bonifacio Development Corporation

Burgos Circle, also known as Padre Burgos Circle, is a traffic circle within the Bonifacio Global City in Taguig, Metro Manila, Philippines. It was developed as part of the Forbes Town Center mixed-use development by Megaworld Corporation and named after José Burgos, one of the martyred priests collectively known as Gomburza. Forbestown Road, 1st Avenue, 2nd Avenue, and 29th Street intersect at the circle.

== History ==
Burgos Circle was planned as part of the Forbes Town Center, a mixed-use development by the Megaworld Corporation inspired by Bugis Village in Singapore.

The circle became prominent in 2009 when it was identified as a new dining hotspot. With several new restaurants opening then, Burgos Circle was likened to Remedios Circle, Greenbelt 2, and Serendra as a new, up-and-coming hangout area, mostly catering to young professionals.

In 2013, columnist Stephanie Zubiri wrote in The Philippine Star that Burgos Circle was "a window to the Parisian lifestyle in the heart of Manila", owing to the area's walkability, its wide selection of restaurants, cafes and bars, and the availability of alfresco dining which reminded her of her time in Paris.

== Structure ==
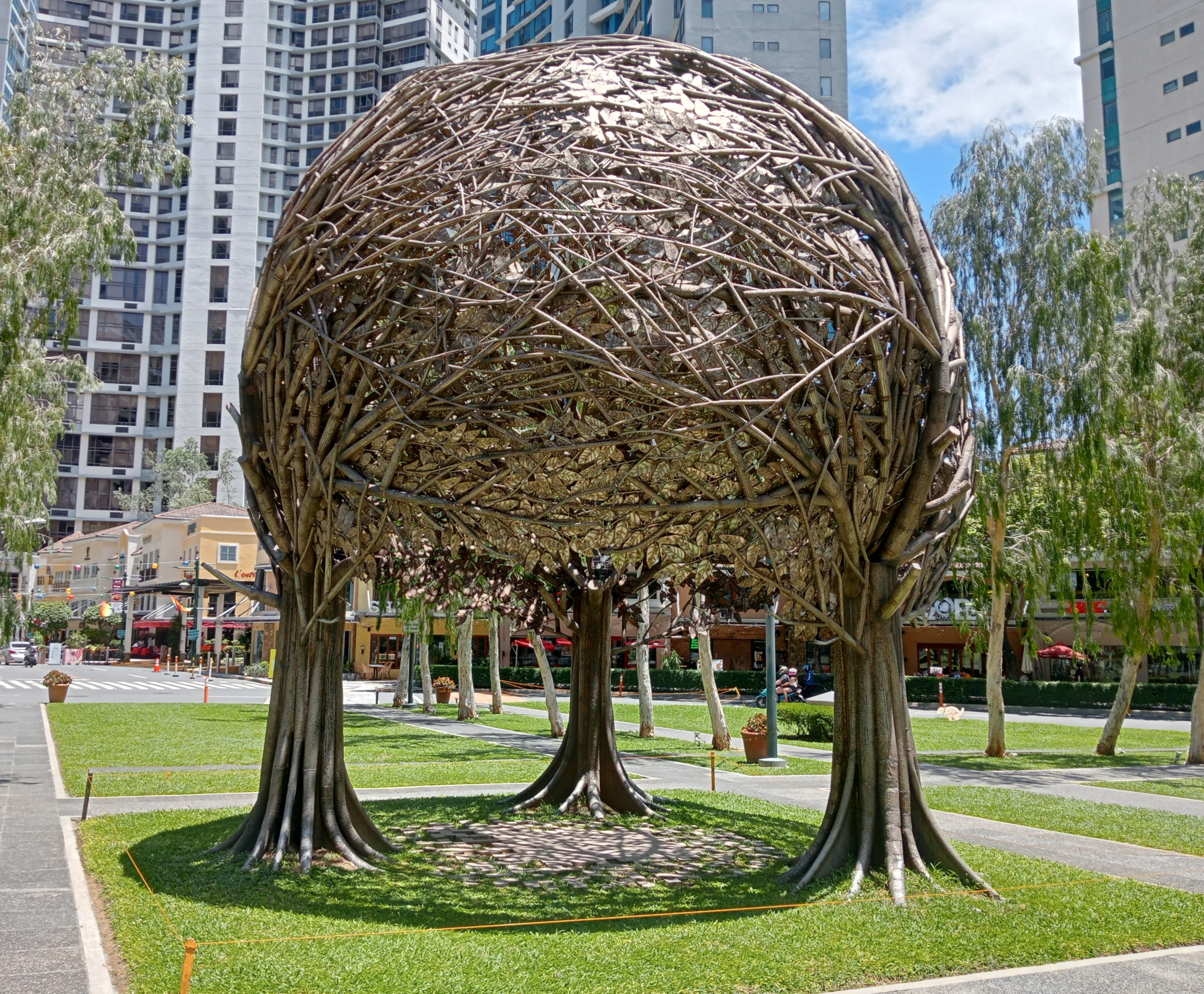
The Trees sculpture

The center island of Burgos Circle forms a small park, Burgos Park. At the center of the park is a sculpture by Reynato Paz Contreras called The Trees, the first piece of public art to be installed in Bonifacio Global City. The bronze-and-brass piece was commissioned by the Bonifacio Art Foundation, which is responsible for maintaining the district's public art installations.

Measuring 6.5 meters (21 ft) tall and surrounded by a grove, The Trees consists of three interlocking trees which form a dome. Representing the circle of life, the trees are a reminder of the progressive development and the preservation of Mother Earth, while the branches represent stability. More recently, the sculpture became a romantic place for couples to meet, and in 2016, it became a major landmark for those playing Pokémon Go in the area, with the game helping to boost foot traffic in the form of increased dining receipts days after it was first released in the Philippines.

Underneath Burgos Park and the circle at large is a 72-meter (236 ft) wide, 12-meter (39 ft) deep retarding basin for retaining flood water. During heavy rain, the basin retains water until it empties when the weather clears into creeks (such as the Balisampan Creek) that flow to Manila Bay. The cistern has a capacity of 22,000 cubic meters (780,000 cu ft) of flood water. Built during the initial development of the Bonifacio Global City for ₱60 million, and only one of two existing retarding basins in Metro Manila (the other located beneath the Magallanes Interchange), it has been credited for preventing flooding on both EDSA and Kalayaan Avenue.
