= Minuscule 737 =

- New Testament manuscript
- Text: Gospel of Matthew
- Date: 13th century
- Script: Greek
- Now at: Bibliothèque nationale de France
- Size: 26.6 cm by 20.8 cm
- Type: Byzantine text-type
- Category: V
- Note: –

Minuscule 737 (in the Gregory-Aland numbering), Θ^{ε306} (von Soden), is a Greek minuscule manuscript of the New Testament written on parchment. Palaeographically it has been assigned to the 13th century. The manuscript has no complex contents. Scrivener labelled it as 755^{e}.

== Description ==
The codex contains the text of the Gospel of Matthew, on 176 parchment leaves (size 26.6 cm by 20.8 cm). The text is written in one column per page, 28-30 lines per page.

The text is divided according to the κεφαλαια (chapters), whose numbers are given at the margin, with their τιτλοι (titles) at the top of the pages.

== Text ==
The Greek text of the codex is a representative of the Byzantine text-type. Aland placed it in Category V.

== History ==
Scrivener and Gregory dated the manuscript to the 13th century. The manuscript is currently dated by the INTF to the 13th century.

The manuscript was added to the list of New Testament manuscripts by Scrivener (755) and Gregory (737). It was examined and described by Paulin Martin. Gregory saw the manuscript in 1885.

The manuscript is now housed at the Bibliothèque nationale de France (Gr. 204) in Paris.

== See also ==
- List of New Testament minuscules
- Biblical manuscript
- Textual criticism
