= Transnational eGlobal =

Transnational eSolutions, Inc., also known as TeSI, is a Philippine-based e-Commerce company. It is a member of the Transnational Diversified Group of Companies (TDG), an entity with over 30 member companies with business interests which include air and travel, shipping and ship management, logistics, BPO, and ICT.

TeSI focuses on building e-commerce platforms for businesses and consumers. tripmoba.com is its first project in the Philippine market followed by Argomall.com

== tripmoba.com ==
Tripmoba.com is the first Filipino online travel site focused in traveling to, from, or within the Philippines. It allows customers to book flights and hotels, access air fares, purchase travel packages, and share trips online.

The name tripmoba is a three-word phrase with Filipino origin. Literally translated, “Trip mo ba?” means “Do you like this?” or “Is this your trip?” According to the Chief Information Officer of TDG, Zaki Delgado, the basis behind calling it “tripmoba,” is to preserve a distinct Filipino flavor but still be identifiable to the international market.

== argomall.com ==
argomall.com is a Filipino-owned online retailer selling smartphones and other related electronic products in the Philippines. This e-commerce platform also doubles as a comparison site for all available smartphones in the said country.

Argomall.com was founded in November 2015 under the Transnational Diversified Group of Companies. In the following year, Home Credit partnered with Argomall.com which made complete online installment application possible for its customers. Home Credit is a non-bank financial institution that originated in Czech Republic. Moving forward, Argomall.com started accepting cryptocurrencies in 2019 as payment in addition to cash-on-delivery and credit card payment options.

In a report published by the iPrice Group in the second quarter of 2018, foreign players dominate the Philippine e-commerce. The only local player that accelerated is Argomall.com which became the top four most visited e-commerce site in the Philippines in the first quarter of 2019.
