= OneEleven =

Skyscraper in Chicago, Illinois

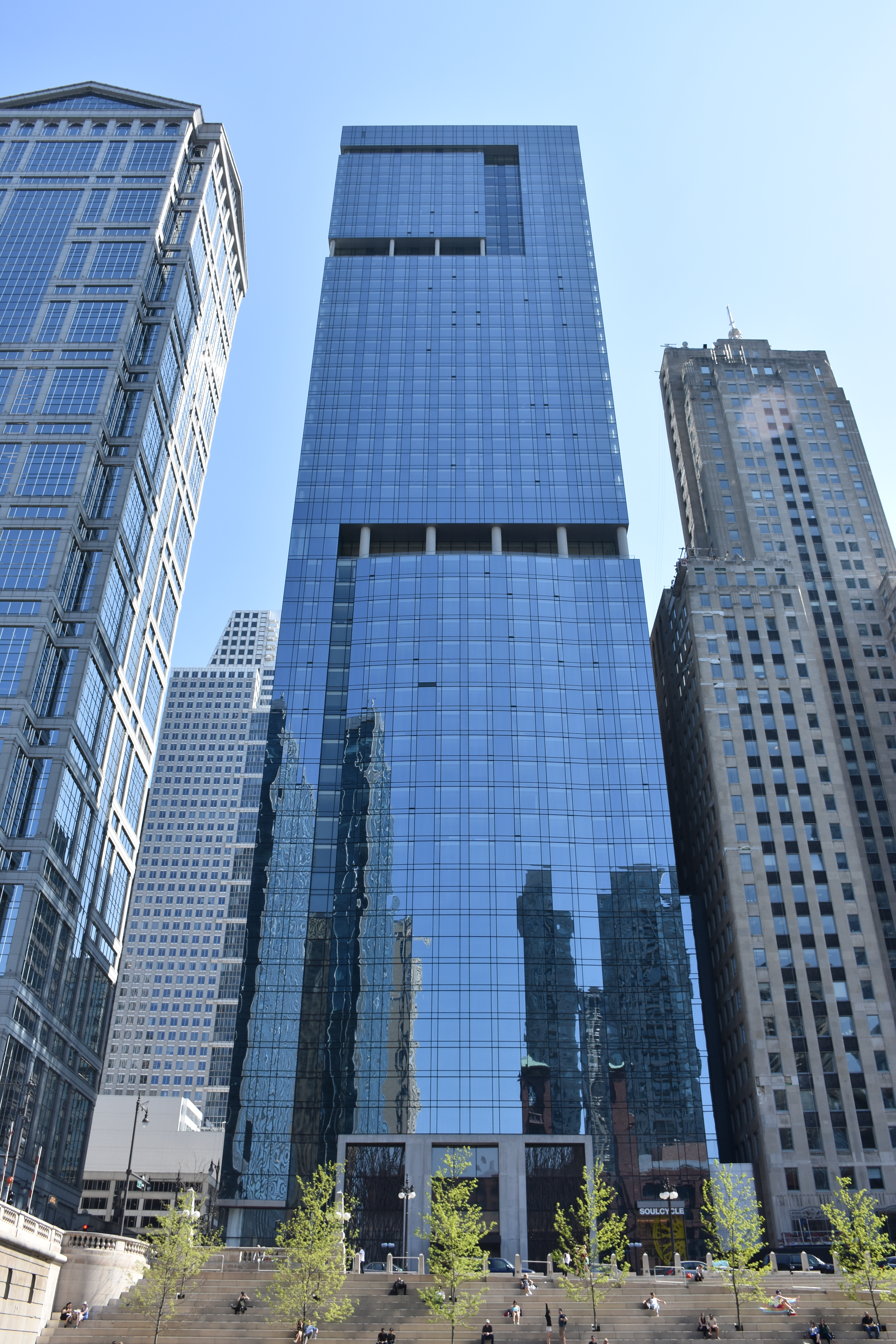
- OneEleven in Chicago (May 2016)
- Interactive map of the OneEleven area
- Former names: 111 W. Wacker; Waterview Tower

General information
- Status: Completed
- Type: Rental residences
- Location: 111 West Wacker Drive; Chicago, Cook County, Illinois, United States
- Coordinates: 41°53′11.5″N 87°37′53″W
- Construction started: 2005
- Completed: 2014
- Owner: Heitman LLC (as of January 2015)

Height
- Roof: 630 ft (190 m)

Technical details
- Floor count: 58 (4 below ground)
- Floor area: 940,002 sq ft (87,329.0 m^{2})
- Lifts/elevators: 10

Design and construction
- Architecture firm: Handel Architects
- Developer: Related Midwest
- Structural engineer: Halvorson and Partners
- Services engineer: Cosentini
- Main contractor: Lend Lease

Website
- oneelevenchicago.com

OneEleven (formerly 111 W. Wacker and Waterview Tower) is a luxury rental apartment tower located in downtown Chicago, Illinois. The building is located between LaSalle Street and Clark Street, adjacent to River North and directly on the Chicago River.

The building was developed by Related Midwest in a joint venture with Clark Wacker LLC and designed by architect Gary Handel of Handel Architects LLP. Kara Mann of Kara Mann Design was selected for interior design. OneEleven was completed in 2014.

OneEleven stands 630 feet (190 m) tall, with 504 units throughout located on 60 stories. The building has 470 total parking spaces, approximately 30,000 square feet (2,800 m^{2}) of amenity space, and 32,000 square feet (3,000 m^{2}) of retail space. The tower was built on Wacker Drive, between LaSalle Street and Clark Street, where a parking lot had been. The building's official address is 111 W. Wacker Drive.

== Design and architecture ==
OneEleven was designed as a retrofit for the abandoned Waterview Tower project, designed by Thomas Hoepf of Teng and Associates, Inc., and developed in association with Waterview LLC, of which only 26 floors were ever completed. The old building was salvaged and renovated. The original stone façade of the building was removed in favor of a glass exterior, and an additional 34 floors were added to its height. Where the old and new sections of building meet there is an amenities level with indoor pool, sun deck, fire pit and outdoor kitchens.

== History ==
Construction began in 2005 and continued through May 2008, when construction ceased on the original Waterview Tower, after the parking garage portion and most of the hotel floors had been completed.

The first 26 floors of OneEleven were originally part of Waterview Tower, which was intended to be a 92-story luxury 1,047-foot-tall (319 m) hotel and condominium; financial setbacks caused construction to halt in 2008. It was initially planned to have parking for guests and residents on floors 2 to 11, and a setback at the 29th floor would have held a rooftop garden and the amenities level for guests and residents. The remaining 30th through 88th floors were to have comprised 233 condominium and penthouse residences. Originally designed to be a concrete building; an exterior wall made of glass, granite and aluminum was designed to resemble a prism.

In 2011, developer Related Midwest took an interest in the abandoned tower and conducted an engineering study of the property to determine if any of the existing structure was salvageable. The results of the study were favorable and it was decided to renovate and add on to the old tower.

In 2012, 111 West Wacker Partners LLC, the new joint venture, proposed a completely new design that re-purposed the existing structure into a luxury rental tower to better suit the current real estate market. As a result, the building would no longer contain a hotel and condominiums, but contain 506 rental units, an expansive first-floor retail space, and 439 parking spaces. The new building, designed by Handel Architects, is substantially smaller in height, at 59 stories and 630 ft (190 m) tall.

In January 2015, about six months after its opening, developer Related sold the whole building for $328.225 million to Heitman LLC. The average price of $651,000 per unit reportedly set a record for apartment buildings in Chicago.

== See also ==
- The Peninsula Chicago
- List of buildings
- List of skyscrapers
- List of tallest buildings in Chicago
- List of tallest buildings in the United States
- World's tallest structures
