= Shangri-La at the Fort, Manila =

Hotel in Bonifacio Global City, Philippines

Shangri-La The Fort, Manila

- The Shangri-La The Fort, Manila in March 2020
- Interactive map of the Shangri-La The Fort, Manila area
- Hotel chain: Shangri-La Hotels and Resorts

General information
- Status: Completed
- Type: Mixed-use
- Location: 5th Avenue corner 30th Street, Bonifacio Global City, Taguig, Metro Manila, Philippines
- Coordinates: 14°33′09″N 121°02′48″E
- Construction started: July 2008
- Completed: 2016
- Opening: March 1, 2016; 10 years ago
- Cost: US$250 million
- Owner: Shangri-La Asia, Ltd.; Shang Properties

Height
- Architectural: 247 m (810 ft)

Technical details
- Material: Concrete
- Floor count: 63
- Floor area: 111,568 m^{2} (1,200,910 sq ft) or 130,000 m^{2} (1,400,000 sq ft)
- Lifts/elevators: 18

Design and construction
- Architect: Handel Architects
- Developer: Shangri-La Asia, Ltd.
- Other designers: GF and Partners Architects (architect of record); Manny Samson and Associates (interior design)

Other information
- Number of units: 530 hotel rooms; 195 residential units
- Number of suites: 46
- Number of restaurants: 7

Shangri-La at The Fort, also known as Shangri-La The Fort, Manila, is a mixed-use complex located in Bonifacio Global City, Fort Bonifacio, Taguig. The development contains a five-star luxury hotel, event venues, retail and the luxury residential units of the Shangri-La Residences The Fort, Manila and Horizon Homes, both of which were operated by Shang Properties. It opened on March 1, 2016, and is one of the three hotels managed by Shangri-La Hotels and Resorts located in Metro Manila.

At 247 m (810 ft) tall, it is one of the tallest skyscrapers in the Philippines.

== Architecture and design ==
US-based Handel Architects is the design architect of the Shangri-La at the Fort, while GF and Partners Architects Co. is the architect of record. Manny Samson and Associates were the interior designers of the building.

== Construction ==
Shangri-La at the Fort in 2015

The groundbreaking for the building took place on July 3, 2008, in a ceremony led by then-Philippine President Gloria Macapagal Arroyo, though construction began in 2011. The hotel had a soft opening on March 1, 2016.

== Facilities ==
=== Hotel ===
The Shangri-La Hotel at the Fort hosts 576 rooms and suites as of August 2017, with each room at least 45 m^{2} (480 sq ft) big.

=== Residential ===
The building has two designated residential areas, namely Horizon Homes and Shangri-La Residences. The 98 units in Horizon Homes, which are privately owned, occupy the upper levels of the tower. Ranging from 90 to 239 m^{2} (970 to 2,570 sq ft), 97 units are allocated for Shangri-La Residence.

=== Other ===
Two levels occupying an area of 8,000 m^{2} (86,000 sq ft) of the Shangri-La at the Fort building are dedicated to Kerry Sports Manila, a sports and leisure area that hosts indoor courts for basketball, tennis, and squash, as well as a lap pool, gymnasium, exercise studio, and spa facility. For events, the building has two event halls; the pillar-less 1,800 m^{2} (19,000 sq ft) Grand Ball Room can accommodate 1,800 people and the 780 m^{2} (8,400 sq ft) Bonifacio Hall can hold 715 people. Nineteen multifunction rooms are also spread across the building's several floors. The Adventure Zone is a multilevel children's playground.

The building also hosts seven main dining outlets, namely: High Street Café, High Street Lounge, Canton Road, Raging Bull Chophouse and Bar, Samba Poolside, and Limitless. 6,000 m^{2} (65,000 sq ft), concentrated mostly on the building's ground floor is dedicated to retail, housing stores of Gentle Monster, % Arabica, and Malbon Golf.
