= 737 Park Avenue =

Apartment building in Manhattan, New York

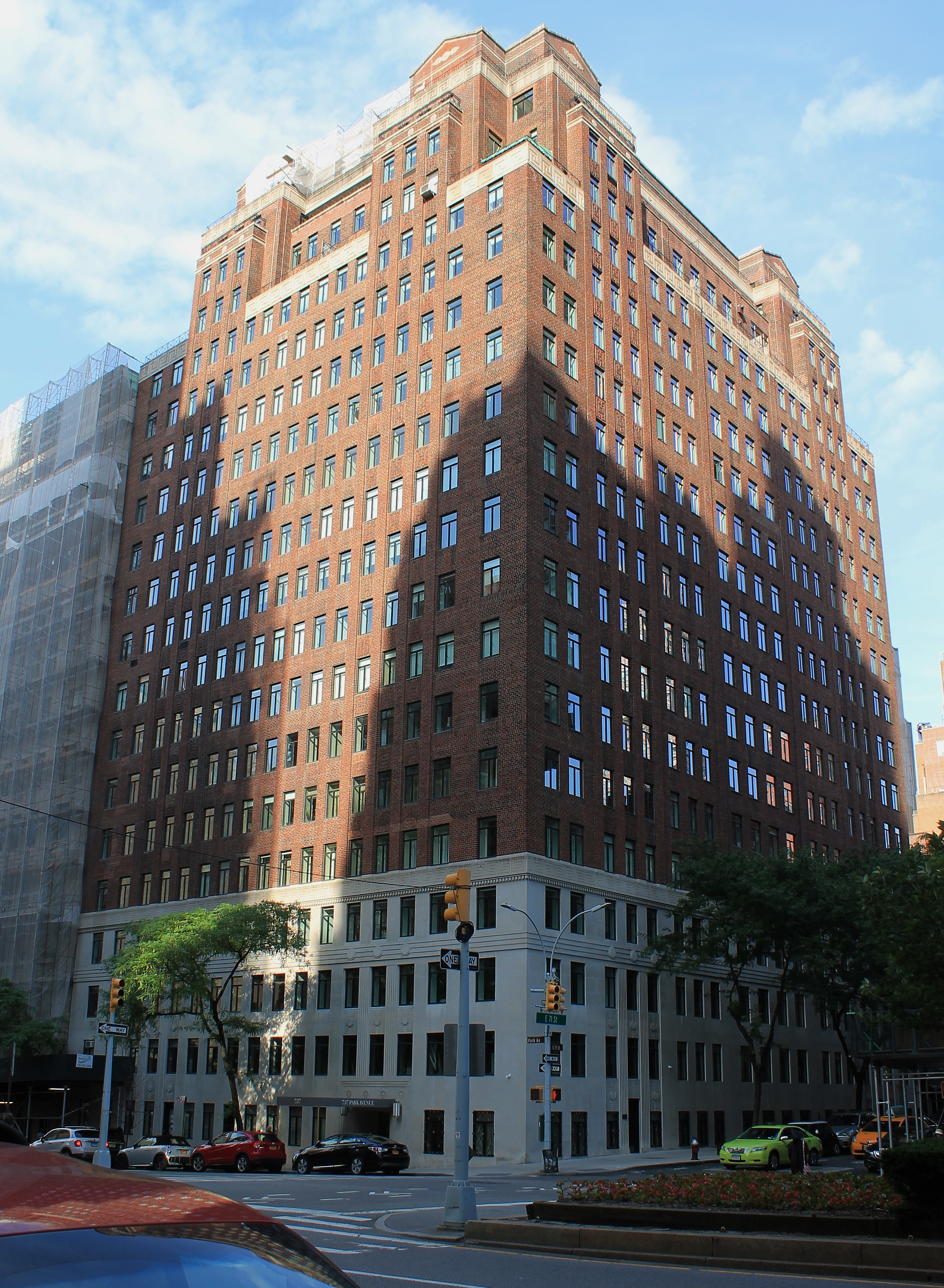
- Interactive map of the 737 Park Avenue area

General information
- Status: Completed
- Type: Residential
- Architectural style: Art deco
- Location: 737 Park Avenue, Manhattan, New York, United States
- Coordinates: 40.7705°N 73.9639°W
- Current tenants: 60 apartments
- Completed: 1940
- Owner: Harry Macklowe

Height
- Height: 205 feet (62 m)

Technical details
- Floor count: 20

Design and construction
- Architect: Sylvan Bien
- Developer: Sam Minskoff and Sons

737 Park Avenue is a prewar residential building on the Upper East Side of Manhattan, New York City, United States. Initially, the building had more than 100 apartments. The current capacity after renovation is 60 apartments.

== Overview ==
Built in 1940 by Sam Minskoff and Sons, the building was designed by art deco architect Sylvan Bien. The building is made of traditional red brick with a limestone base, featuring a marble lobby and 24-hour doorman. The building is located on the corner of 71st street, within blocks of Central Park, The Frick Collection, and The Whitney Museum, as well as The Carlyle Hotel, also designed by Sylvan Bien. In 2011, 737 Park Avenue was sold to real estate developer Harry Macklowe, who is currently developing the building into condominiums.
