= Kushner =

The surname Kushner is an English-based transliteration of the Yiddish name קושנער, a variant of קושניר (Kushnir), an occupational name stemming from קירזשנער (kirzshner), a furrier. This is related to the German word Kürschner and the Ukrainian word кушнір (kushnir), with the same meaning.

== People ==
Notable people with the surname include:

- Alexander Kushner, Russian poet
- Bernard Kouchner, French politician and physician
- Boris Kushner (disambiguation), multiple persons
- Burton J. Kushner, ophthalmologist
- Dave Kushner, U.S. guitarist
- David Kushner, writer
- David Howard Kushner, American gynecologist-obstetrician and infertility specialist
- Donald Kushner, American film producer
- Donn Kushner, Canadian scientist and writer
- Ellen Kushner, U.S. fantasy author
- Eva Kushner, Canadian scholar
- Eva Bella Kushner, American child actress and voice actress
- Harold (Samuel) Kushner, Conservative rabbi and author
- Harold J. Kushner, U.S. applied mathematics professor at Brown University
- Lawrence Kushner, Reform rabbi and author
- Rachel Kushner, U.S. author
- Renee Diane Kushner, better known as Diane Renay, American pop singer
- Tony Kushner, U.S. playwright and screenwriter
- Yvonne Levy Kushner, American actress and fundraiser

== Kushner-Berkowitz-Trump American real estate family ==
- Kushner family
  - Joseph Kushner (né: Berkowitz), founder of the Kushner real-estate mogul family
    - Charles Kushner, real estate mogul, son of Joseph and Rae
      - Jared Kushner, senior White House official and husband of Ivanka Trump, son of Charles, son-in-law of President Donald Trump
      - Ivanka Trump Kushner, wife of Jared, daughter of Donald Trump and Ivana Trump
        - Arabella Kushner, daughter of Jared and Ivanka
      - Joshua Kushner, businessman, son of Charles
    - Murray Kushner, real estate mogul, son of Joseph and Rae
      - Marc Kushner, architect, son of Murray

== See also ==
- Kushnir, surname
