= Kushner (disambiguation) =

Kushner is a Jewish surname.

Kushner may also refer to:

- Kushner Companies, a real estate development company
- Kushner Real Estate Group, a real estate development company
- Kushner Studios, an architectural firm
- Kushner, Inc., a 2019 book by Vicky Ward
- Rae Kushner Yeshiva High School, Livingston, New Jersey, USA
- Joseph Kushner Hebrew Academy, Livingston, New Jersey, USA; a yeshiva day school
- Kushner equation, an equation for the conditional probability density of the state of a stochastic non-linear dynamical system

== See also ==
- Cedric Kushner Promotions, Ltd. v. King, a SCOTUS RICO case concerning Don King
- The Kushner-Locke Company, a screen production company
- Kush (disambiguation)
