= Bouquet of Tulips =

Sculpture by Jeff Koons

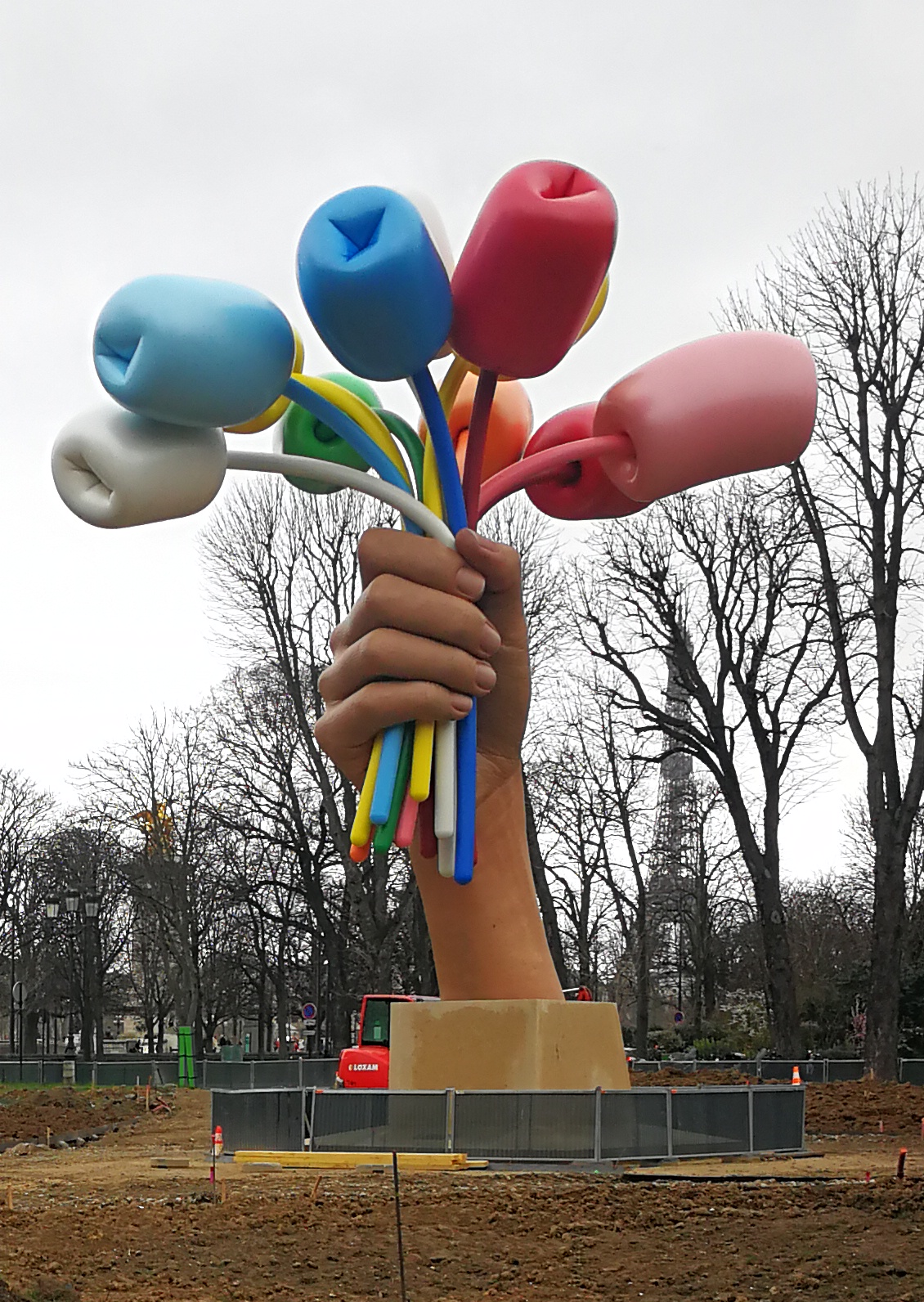
- Artist: Jeff Koons
- Year: 2019
- Medium: Bronze, aluminum, stainless steel
- Dimensions: 11 m (36 ft)
- Weight: 34-ton (sculpture) and 27-ton base
- Location: Paris; 48.8657°N 2.3159°E

Bouquet of Tulips is a metal sculpture by American artist Jeff Koons, which is located outside the Petit Palais in Paris, France. It is one of Koons's largest sculptures, and his first commemorative work. The sculpture was first announced in 2016 and unveiled in October 2019.

== Artwork ==
The 11 m (36 ft) tall sculpture of a hand clutching stylized flowers, modeled on the Statue of Liberty and made of polychromed bronze, aluminum, and stainless steel, honors the victims of the November 2015 attacks. The bouquet features 11 flowers and not a dozen, with the missing 12th meant to represent the victims.

In 2019, Koons announced that 80% of the proceeds from selling the copyright of the artwork for commercial products depicting the sculpture will go to the victims' families. The remaining 20% will be dedicated to its maintenance.

== History ==
Koons announced the gift of a sculpture to the people of Paris in November 2016, after Jane D. Hartley, the United States ambassador to France at the time, had asked him to create a tribute to the victims of the terrorist attacks in France in 2015 and 2016. Hartley had approached Koons after discussing the idea at a dinner in Paris in January 2016 with Jerry Speyer, then chairman of the board of the Museum of Modern Art in New York City and a collector of the artist's work.

The sculpture was made in Germany. The costs for production and installation — amounting to 3.5 million euros — was raised from private donations by a nonprofit foundation, Fonds Pour Paris, and its counterpart in the United States, the Paris Foundation. Among the donors to the project are Bernard Arnault, Leon and Debra Black, Kenneth C. Griffin, Leonard Lauder, and Ralph Schlosstein. Koons later added $1 million of his own money, after delays led to an increase in production costs.

The city proposed several sites to Koons, and he chose the one on the plaza in front of the Palais de Tokyo for its symbolic value; also, the plaza is not restricted by historic preservation provisions. Paris mayor Anne Hidalgo subsequently announced that the sculpture was to be installed in 2017 on the plaza in front of the Palais de Tokyo. However, the pavement turned out to be not strong enough to support the 34-ton sculpture and its 27-ton base. Also, there was criticism that the site had no connection with the attacks. In January 2018, 23 French artists, politicians and cultural figures – including the artist Christian Boltanski and a former culture minister, Frédéric Mitterrand – asked for the plan to be abandoned, arguing in a letter to the newspaper Libération that the gift "was opportunistic and cynical". A second open letter, published by Le Monde and signed by various other arts professionals, including Palais de Tokyo cofounder Jérôme Sans and artist Loris Gréaud, followed and was intended as a defense of Koons's sculpture. The plan to place the sculpture in front of the Palais de Tokyo was dropped by Culture Minister Françoise Nyssen in May 2018.

The government's alternative proposal to install the monument in Parc de la Villette was later rejected by city planners. Other venues that were under consideration included the Place des États-Unis. The venue finally chosen is between Place de la Concorde and the Petit Palais, near the Embassy of the United States.

=== Suppressed Brooklyn Rail essay ===
In 2023, art historian Romy Golan wrote a commissioned essay for the Brooklyn Rail comparing Bouquet of Tulips with a 1937 mural by Fernand Léger and Charlotte Perriand. After the Koons studio objected to the piece and called it defamatory, the editors proposed significantly reducing it; Golan withdrew the essay, citing editorial independence concerns. The incident was characterized by several journalism and legal experts as a case of editorial self-censorship.
