= Douglas Jemal =

American real estate developer (born 1942)

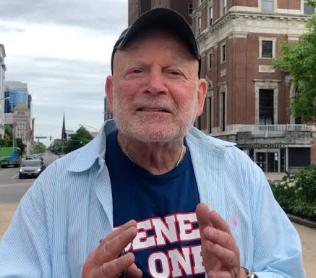
- Born: Douglas Jemal; November 30, 1942 (age 83); Brooklyn, New York City, New York, US
- Occupation: Real estate developer
- Known for: Founder of Douglas Development; Co-founder of Nobody Beats the Wiz
- Spouse: Joyce Gordon
- Children: 6

Douglas Jemal (born November 30, 1942) is an American real estate developer, landlord, and the founder of Douglas Development.

Jemal first worked in electronics retailing, like his father. However, in 1993, he sold his interests in retail and began investing in real estate in the Washington metropolitan area. In 2016, he began focusing on real estate investments in Buffalo, New York.

== Biography ==
Jemal was born to a Syrian Jewish family in south Brooklyn, one of four sons and two daughters of Norman Jemal and Sally Chira, a discount retailer in lower Manhattan. He attended David Boody Jr. High School but dropped out at age 15, during the 9th grade. He then worked odd jobs such as auction house runner, a delivery driver, and sold items on 14th Street during the Christmas shopping season. He joined his father's business at age 18, but 5 years later, he was bored and moved to Washington, D.C. to open his own store.

=== Retail ===
In 1966, at age 23, he and his younger brother Lawrence Jemal opened a store called Bargaintown in Washington, D.C. on the current site of the Capital One Arena. He set speakers outside the store to attract customers, and, after noise complaints, bought the building for $5,000. In 1971, they opened a location at Iverson Mall and closed the D.C. location. In 1976, they returned to New York and along with two other brothers, Marvin Jemal and Stephen Jemal, founded Nobody Beats the Wiz (the name of their father's favorite Broadway musical), a discount electronics chain. In 1980, he and Lawrence bought George's, a 15-store electronics chain in the Baltimore and Washington metropolitan area, from the estate of George Wasserman but sold it to Luskin's the following year. Douglas sold his shares in the Wiz back to the family in 1993.

=== Washington, D.C. real estate ===
Jemal invested the proceeds into real estate in the Washington metropolitan area, which was opportune as the city was in a down cycle. His success was compounded by the fact that he recognized that retail was under-present in D.C., with half the national average of retail space per capita, and he focused his leasing efforts on high-end retailers, which would improve neighborhoods.

In the early 1990s, he purchased the former Wonder Bread bakery on Georgia Avenue near Howard University for $4.5 million; he renovated and sold it for just under $18 million in 1993. That year, he purchased the Park & Shop complex on Connecticut Avenue in Cleveland Park for $6 million; after attracting tenants, he sold it for $11 million in 1995.

In 1993, Jemal and his brothers offered $150 million to buy the Baltimore Orioles but were outbid by Peter Angelos.

By 2001, he owned approximately 70 buildings with an estimated value in the hundreds of millions of dollars. These included 15 buildings on 7th Street between E and I Streets NW in Chinatown.

In 2014, Jemal began redevelopment of the former Hecht's Warehouse in Ivy City into 300 apartments and 250,000 square feet of retail space.

By 2019, he owed 200 properties.

In December 2021, he sold two Marriott International hotels in Washington, D.C. to an investor group affiliated with the Marriott family for $152 million.

=== Buffalo real estate ===
In 2016, Jemal purchased the vacant 38-story One Seneca Tower, the tallest building in Buffalo, for $12.6 million. He redeveloped it at a cost of $150 million and by 2021, it was 80% leased.

In 2020, he acquired the Statler City complex in Buffalo for redevelopment.

In 2021, Jemal acquired the former police headquarters building near Niagara Square, with plans for a $30 million redevelopment into apartments called "The Police Apartments."

In September 2021, Jemal announced plans to build a nine-story building at 61 Terrace Street.

In 2021, Jemal acquired the 64-acre Boulevard Mall with plans to redevelop the property. He also renovated the Hotel Henry on the Richardson Olmsted Complex, which was renamed The Richardson Hotel.
in June 2025, Jemal announced that the Richardson Olmsted Campus would be operating the Richardson Hotel, as of July 1.

In September 2021, he acquired the Hyatt Regency Buffalo.

In October 2021, he acquired the Mahoney State Office Building at public auction for $4.1 million. He listed it for sale in May 2025.

In December 2022, he acquired the HSBC Atrium from HSBC for $9 million.

In 2024, Jemal acquired One News Plaza (rented to The Buffalo News), an adjacent production facility, and the parking lot across Scott Street.

== Personal life ==
Jemal's sons Norman Jemal and Matthew Jemal are active in the real estate business. His daughter, Kim Jemal Cayre, is married to the nephew of Joseph Cayre, a New York real estate developer and record producer.

In 2020, Jemal purchased a $1.425 million house in the Nottingham Terrace area of Buffalo.

=== Politics and pardon ===
Jemal has contributed to politicians of both major U.S. political parties but he has given more to Republicans. In 2016, he contributed $32,000 to the Republican National Committee and in 2020, he contributed $100,000 to the RNC. He contributed $2,700 to the Donald Trump 2016 presidential campaign. He is also friends with real estate developer Charles Kushner, whose son-in-law, Jared Kushner, is married to Ivanka Trump.

On January 20, 2021, Jemal received a pardon for his 2008 wire fraud conviction from President Donald Trump.

In December 2021, a denial of a liquor license for an associate of Jemal was reversed after it was noted that he contributed over $53,000 to the campaign of Governor of New York Kathy Hochul.

== Awards and recognition ==
In August 2014, Jemal received the Lifetime Achievement award from the District of Columbia Awards for Excellence in Historic Preservation.

In December 2019, Jemal was inducted into the Washington Business Hall of Fame.

== Criticism and legal issues ==
Jamal has been criticized for often paying his contractors late to fund more real estate purchases. Turnover was high in his company as superintendents were stressed. He has been criticized for leaving derelict properties vacant rather than developing them and for asking for very high rents, forcing out long-standing local tenants.

Jemal was accused or bribery for his relationship with Michael Lorusso, deputy director of D.C.'s Office of Property Management. Jemal bought Lorusso trips to Las Vegas, a Rolex watch, two pairs of $500 cowboy boots, and gave him $15,000 in cash. In 2002, Lorusso set up a deal whereby the D.C. government purchased an impound lot from Jemal for $12.5 million, nearly 10 times the amount Jemal paid for it just four years earlier. Lorusso also approved a $1 million lease payment to Jemal from the city. Despite Lorusso pleading guilty to bribery, Jemal was acquitted of bribery by a 12-person jury.

In July 2006, Jemal was convicted of wire fraud for falsifying an invoice to withdraw money from a lender-held reserve, which he needed to buy another property. This was all unbeknownst to his partner in the deal, Joseph Cayre, although Cayre defended Jemal in the legal proceedings. Jemal was sentenced to a $175,000 fine and received five years probation, but no prison time. The judge cited his charitable giving in the sentencing.
