= Romy Golan =

American academic and author

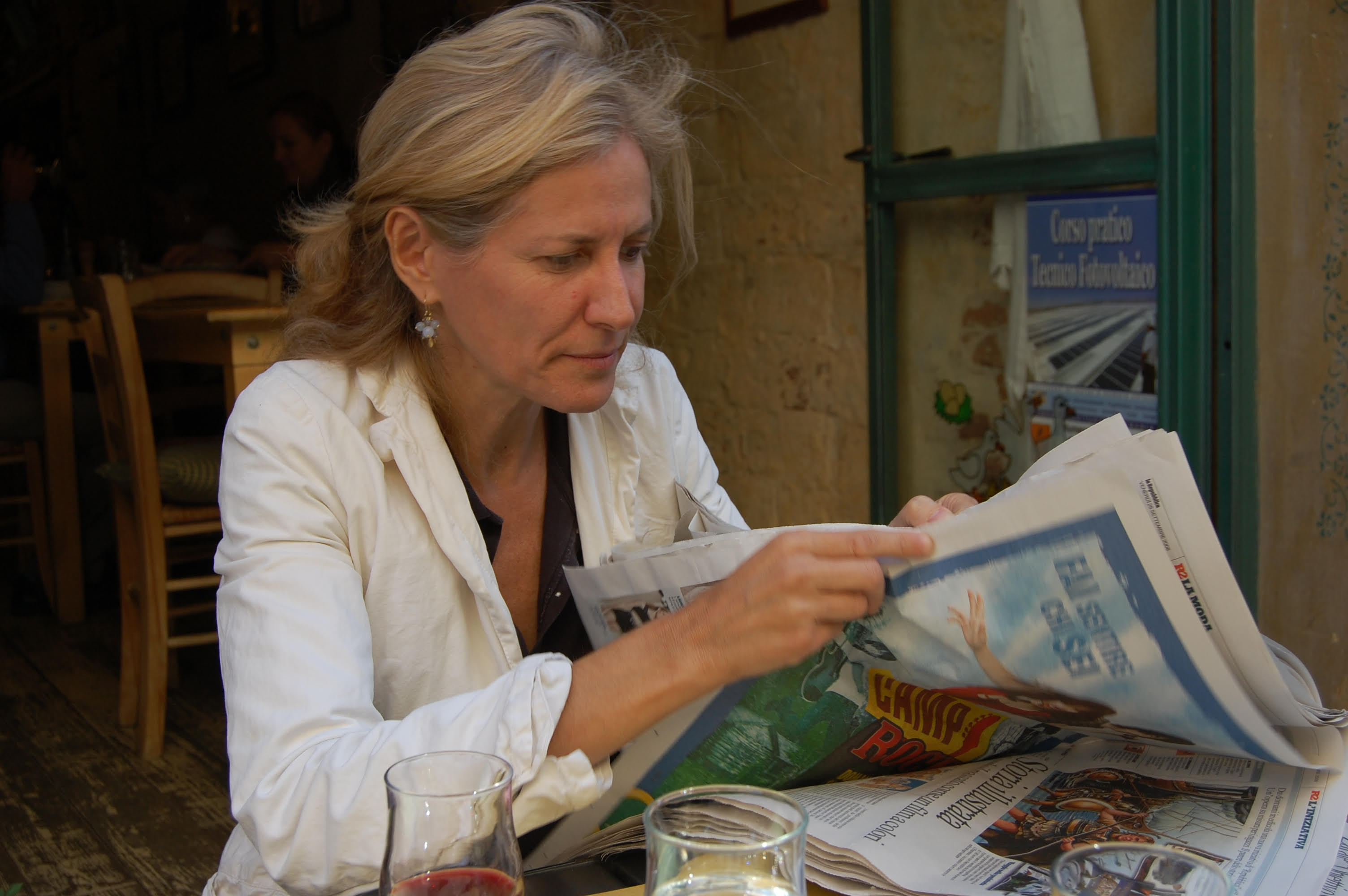
- Professor Romy Golan
- Education: Courtauld Institute of Art (Ph.D.)
- Occupation: Art historian
- Employer: CUNY Graduate Center
- Website: gc-cuny.academia.edu/RomyGolan

Romy Golan is an art historian and professor in the Ph.D. program in art history at the CUNY Graduate Center. Her research focuses on modern European art, particularly French and Italian painting of the interwar and postwar period.

== Education and career ==
Golan completed her Ph.D. at the Courtauld Institute of Art, London in 1989. Before joining the faculty of The Graduate Center in 1998, Golan taught at Vassar College (1987–2002) and Yale University (1993–1998).

=== Research and publications ===
Golan’s first book, Modernity and Nostalgia: Art and Politics in France between the Wars (1995) posits a number of reversals between avant-garde and rearguard. In a challenge to traditional scholarship on interwar France, Golan argued that neo-traditional belle peinture and modernist painting, cosmopolitanism and xenophobia, in fact often shared the same stage.

In Muralnomad: The Paradox of Wall Painting, Europe 1927-1957 (2009), Golan explored the transmediality of the mural image. The book looks at mural paintings, including works by Claude Monet, Mario Sironi, and Pablo Picasso, that were not truly convinced that they belonged on walls. Installed in unorthodox manners, these public works manifested an ambivalence about their charged ideological identity.

Her most recent book is Flashback, Eclipse. The Political Imaginary of Italian Art in the 1960s (Zone Books, 2021). Structured by two forms of non-linear and decidedly non-presentist forms of temporality, the flashback and the eclipse, this book argues that Italian art of the 1960s reimagined Italian (and European) history, but in oblique form. The reimagining occurred as modernism in the country was formerly aligned with Italian fascism.

=== Curatorial work ===
Golan's curatorial work includes Encounters with the 1930s at the Museo Reina Sofia in 2012 and Avigdor Stematsky’s Late Works at the Tel Aviv Museum of Art in 2008. She has also contributed catalogue essays to exhibitions including Le Paris de Dufy at the Musée de Montmartre in 2021, Charlotte Perriand: Inventing a New World at the Fondation Louis Vuitton, Paris in 2019, and Postwar: Art between the Pacific and the Atlantic, 1945–1965 at the Haus der Kunst, Munich in 2016.

=== Suppressed Brooklyn Rail essay ===
In 2023, Golan wrote a commissioned essay for the Brooklyn Rail comparing Jeff Koons's Bouquet of Tulips with a 1937 mural by Fernand Léger and Charlotte Perriand. After the Koons studio objected to the piece and called it defamatory, the editors proposed significantly reducing it; Golan withdrew the essay, citing editorial independence concerns. The incident was characterized by several journalism and legal experts as a case of editorial self-censorship.

== Works ==
=== Books ===
- Modernity and Nostalgia: Art and Politics in France Between the Wars (Yale University Press, 1995)
- Muralnomad: The Paradox of Wall Painting, Europe 1927–1957 (Yale University Press, 2009)
  - Golan, Romy (2019). Muralnomad: Le paradoxe de l'image murale en Europe (1927–1957) (in French). Translated by Yersin Legrand, Sophie. Paris: Editions Macula. ISBN 978-2-86589-103-0.
- Flashback, Eclipse: The Political Imaginary of Italian Art in the 1960s (Zone Books, 2021)

=== Selected articles and book chapters ===
- Golan, Romy (January 1, 2020). "Boogie Woogie in Rome (1953): A Geopolitical Tableau". Art History. doi:10.1111/1467-8365.12530. S2CID 224907804.
- Golan, Romy (January 1, 2020). "Is Fascist realism a magic realism?". RES: Anthropology and Aesthetics. 73–74: 221–237. doi:10.1086/710830. S2CID 230713478.
- Golan, Romy (2018). "Monumental Fairytales: Mural Images during the Ventennio". Post Zang Tumb Tuuum. Art Life Politics Italia 1918–1945. Milan: Prada Foundation.
- Golan, Romy (2017). "Campo Urbano: Episodes from an Unwritten History of Participation". Bruno Munari: The Lightness of Art. Oxford: Peter Lang.
- Golan, Romy (2017). "Temporalités cachées dans Campo Urbano Transbordeur.pdf". Transbordeur: Photographie histoire société.
- Golan, Romy (2014). "Vitalità del negativo/Negativo della vitalità *". October. 150: 113–132. doi:10.1162/OCTO_a_00203. S2CID 57568992.
