= Luskin's =

Defunct electronics chain based in Baltimore, Maryland, US

- Industry: Retail
- Founded: 1948; 78 years ago
- Founders: Jack and Joe Luskin
- Defunct: 1996; 30 years ago
- Fate: Bankruptcy and liquidation
- Headquarters: Baltimore, Maryland, United States
- Area served: Maryland, Washington, D.C. and Virginia
- Products: Consumer electronics, home appliances, car audio sales and installation, office equipment, parts and accessories
- Services: Repair and installation

Luskin's was an electronics retailer based in Baltimore, Maryland that operated between 1948 and 1996. It focused on low prices and was known for its slogan "The Cheapest Guy in Town". At its peak, it had 56 stores in 11 states.

== History ==
Luskin's was founded as an ice supply company by Jack Luskin and his brother Joe in 1948; it then sold refrigerators and electronics to its customers.

In 1981, it acquired George's, a 15-store electronics chain in the Baltimore and Washington metropolitan area, from Douglas Jemal, who bought it from the estate of George Wasserman a year earlier.

In 1984, it expanded into the Midwestern United States by acquiring Tokyo Shapiro, 5-store chain under bankruptcy protection.

In May 1985, Luskin's became a public company via an initial public offering. The Luskin family maintained a 72% interest in the company, and owned the land on which several stores were located. At that time, it had 29 stores.

In November 1985, it expanded further in the Midwestern United States by acquiring Sound & Sight, an 11-store chain.

In early September 1996, the company closed 8 of its stores in the Baltimore-Washington metropolitan area, citing competition from Best Buy. However, in late September 1996, the company closed its 12 remaining stores in the area. In November 1996, it closed stores in Virginia.

In February 1997, the company filed for Chapter 11 bankruptcy protection.

Jack Luskin died on December 1, 2017 at the age of 89; his daughter is Jamie McCourt.

== Controversies and legal issues ==
In 1981, the Attorney General of Maryland sued Luskin's over deceptive advertising prices; the company settled out of court.

A July 1992 promotion of free airfare and discounted hotel rates was controversial for requiring a purchase; however, a judge ruled that the ads were not deceptive.
