= Howard H. Leach =

American diplomat and businessman

Howard Leach
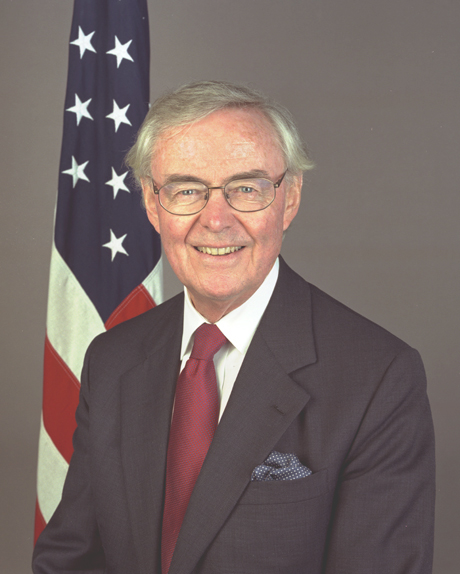

United States Ambassador to France
- In office July 16, 2001 – April 16, 2005
- President: George W. Bush
- Preceded by: Felix Rohatyn
- Succeeded by: Craig Roberts Stapleton

Personal details
- Born: June 19, 1930 (age 96) Salinas, California, U.S.
- Party: Republican
- Education: Yale University (B.S.); Stanford Graduate School of Business

Howard H. Leach (born June 19, 1930) is an American diplomat and businessman. He served as the United States Ambassador to France from 2001 to 2005.

== Early life and education ==
Leach was born in Salinas, California. He earned a Bachelor of Science degree from Yale University in 1952. He studied at Stanford Graduate School of Business in 1953 and at the Stanford Advanced Management College in 1968.

== Career ==
=== Business career ===
A businessman and private investor, Leach began his entrepreneurial career as co-founder and president of various food-processing corporations from 1958 to 1971 in his hometown of Salinas, California. From 1995 to 2000, he served as president and major shareholder of Tejon Ranch Company. He also invested in the Royal Packing Company, Merit Packaging Co., Larson Cooling Co., Cypress Farms Inc., Charles G. Watts Inc., Union Ice Company, Sterling Inc. in Wisconsin, Kestrel Dental Corp., and Sybron Corporation. He was an early limited partner in Forstmann Little & Company. He was also the president of Foley Timber and Land Company, Leach Capital, Leach McMicking & Company, and Hunter Fan.

=== Diplomatic career ===
Leach served as United States Ambassador to France from 2001 to 2005. He was rated highly by the Office of the Inspector General of the Department of State. A 2005 report by the OIG stated that he demonstrated "a solid knowledge of issues across the spectrum of both policy and management priorities at the embassy", nevertheless did not help to smooth the way between the Elysée Palace and the White House during the Chirac-Bush clash on the Iraq war in 2003 according to the French press.

=== Philanthropy ===
He was directly involved in managing a number of public interest associations, including the National Legal Research Center for the Public Interest in Washington and the Pacific Research Institute in San Francisco. He was also vice president of the San Francisco Opera. He has donated in excess of US$50,000 to the American Hospital of Paris in Neuilly-sur-Seine.

== Personal life ==
Leach is a former member and past chairman of the Regents of the University of California. He is married to Gretchen Leach, a philanthropist. They reside in Palm Beach, Florida.

Diplomatic posts
Preceded by Felix Rohatyn	U.S. Ambassador to France; 2001–2005	Succeeded by Craig Roberts Stapleton
