= Denise Tourover Ezekiel =

American lawyer

- Born: Denise Levy; May 16, 1903; New Iberia, Louisiana
- Died: January 15, 1980 (aged 76); Washington, D.C.
- Other names: Denise Tourover
- Occupations: Lawyer, Humanitarian

Denise Tourover Ezekiel (1903-1980) was an American lawyer who served in various executive positions for Hadassah, the Women's Zionist Organization of America from the 1930s until her retirement in 1976 including as Hadassah's Washington D.C. representative beginning in 1939 and as a coordinator of Hadassah's food surplus distribution programs from 1950 to 1974.

== Early life, Marriage, and Family ==
Denise Tourover Ezekiel (née Levy) was born in New Iberia, Louisiana on May 16, 1903, and grew up in New Orleans. She was one of three children of Leopold and Blanche (née Coguenhem) Levy. Before moving the family to New Orleans, Leopold Levy helped to establish the first synagogue in New Iberia in 1904. Tourover Ezekiel's sister was the American actress Yvonne Levy Kushner (1906-1990).

Denise Levy married Raphael Tourover, an American patent lawyer, on November 14, 1926. They had one daughter, Mendelle. Raphael Tourover died in 1961. In 1972, Denise Tourover married Walter N. Ezekiel.

== Education and career ==
Denise Tourover Ezekiel moved to Washington D.C. where she earned a law degree from George Washington University School of Law and was admitted to the Bar of the District of Columbia in 1924.

Tourover Ezekiel became a member of Hadassah in 1925 or 1926. She served as president of the Washington Chapter of Hadassah in the 1930s and then as president of the Seaboard Region. In 1939, Tourover Ezekiel was elected to the National Board of Hadassah and also began serving as the organization's Washington representative. As the Washington D.C. representative she served as a liaison between Hadassah and various governmental agencies. During World War II, she played a key role for Hadassah in lobbying to rescue and secure the immigration of a group of over 850 Polish Jewish children, known as the Tehran Children, to Palestine.

From 1950 to 1974, Tourover Ezekiel was one of the coordinators of Hadassah's various food surplus distribution programs which distributed food and agricultural supplies in Israel. In this capacity, she also served as a representative on the American Food for Peace Council organized by the United States Department of State from 1961 to 1964.

Tourover Ezekiel was also a member of the Actions Committee of the World Zionist Organization from 1956 to 1976 and was actively involved in the National Conference of Christians and Jews (now the National Conference for Community and Justice) and the National Civil Liberties Clearing House.

== Honors ==
Tourover Ezekiel was named Hadassah's "Women of the Year" in 1954. She also received the "Woman of Conscience" award from the National Council of Women of the United States for her work (as a representative of Hadassah) in establishing social services for Arab populations in Israel.

== Death ==
In 1980, Denise Tourover Ezekiel died of complications from heart disease in Washington D.C.
