= The Wiz (store) =

Defunct American retailer

Nobody Beats the Wiz
- The 1998–2003 Wiz logo
- Industry: Retail
- Founded: 1977; 2004 (online retailer owned by P.C. Richard)
- Founders: Stephen Jemal; Douglas Jemal; Lawrence Jemal; Marvin Jemal
- Defunct: 2003 (retail stores only)
- Headquarters: Carteret, New Jersey
- Products: Computers, televisions, VCRs, and DVD players
- Parent: Cablevision (electronics chain); P.C. Richard & Son (online retailer)
- Website: thewiz.com

The Wiz, also known at times as Nobody Beats the Wiz, was a chain of electronic stores in the northeastern United States, located primarily in New York, Pennsylvania and New Jersey.

== History ==
The chain was founded by Stephen Jemal and he included his brothers Lawrence, Marvin, and Douglas Jemal, in New York City in 1977. Later, it officially changed its name to its well-known advertising slogan, "Nobody Beats The Wiz." During the early-to-mid 1990s "Nobody Beats The Wiz" was a major sponsor for many local New York City-area sports franchises, including the Yankees, Knicks, Mets, New Jersey Nets, Rangers, New Jersey Devils and Islanders. It also sponsored teams outside the New York City area such as the Orioles, Flyers, Whalers and Canadiens. In 1996, the company threatened legal action against the Major League Soccer franchise the Kansas City Wiz, who were renamed the Wizards as a response.

In 1998, after having expanded from roughly 20 stores to over 80 stores in less than a year, the chain filed for bankruptcy and was purchased by Cablevision for $80 million (equivalent to $147 million in 2025). Cablevision eventually dropped the "Nobody Beats the Wiz" slogan. At its peak, in 1996, the firm's revenues were $1.4 billion, with 2,000 employees, operating 94 stores in New York, New Jersey, Connecticut, Maryland, Pennsylvania and Massachusetts. It also operated music-only stores in Maryland and the Washington, D.C. area.

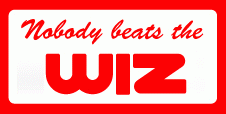
The 1977–1998 and 2004–present Nobody Beats the Wiz logo.

The chain closed permanently in 2003. A Cablevision press release from February 16, 2003 stated: "Continuing to operate the stores is no longer a viable option for Cablevision as business conditions at the retailer eroded due to a weakened retail economy and other factors." Once the chain closed, one of its founders, Marvin Jemal, opened a new electronics chain, The Zone, in a number of former Wiz locations. The new chain, which heavily mentioned that it was from the founder of The Wiz, went out of business less than two years later.

In September 2003, competitor P.C. Richard purchased The Wiz's assets mainly for its name.

== In popular culture ==
In the Seinfeld episode "The Junk Mail", Elaine Benes dates Jack, a man with whom she has a "love at first sight" encounter owing to his appearing as "The Wiz" in a "Nobody Beats the Wiz" commercial.

In the 1999 Thomas Harris novel Hannibal, Mason Verger recalls that at his family's Christian camp, they styled the Risen Christ as "the Riz" because "Nobody Beats the Riz".'

The jingle is interpolated in the chorus of Biz Markie's hit, "Nobody Beats the Biz". Biz substitutes "the Biz" for "the Wiz". The Wiz was rumored to have sued Biz Markie for infringement, but this was not the case.

In Rob Base and DJ E-Z Rock's 1988 hit "It Takes Two," referring to his album, Base raps "Go to the Wiz and select it / Take it off the rack, if it's wack put it back."

In the episode "Veiled Threat" from the show The King of Queens, Doug (in a flashback to his wedding day) mentions wanting a wedding gift of a CD player from The Wiz.

In the season 12 premiere of the show It's Always Sunny in Philadelphia, one of the characters' suggestions to switch back to their old bodies is to go to the store The Wiz to fix Dee's VCR, since they were watching the film The Wiz at the time.

In 1997 through 1998, Mono Puff would occasionally perform a song called "I Beat the Wiz", used to introduce the members of the band.

In the 2013 film The Wolf of Wall Street, an unemployed Jordan Belfort sees a classified ad for a stockboy opening at Nobody Beats the Wiz and thinks that is a way to get hired as a salesman from the inside, but is dissuaded by his wife.

In 2021, New York Yankees broadcaster John Sterling began to exclaim "Nobody beats the Rizz!" after a home run by first baseman Anthony Rizzo.
