= Kushnir =

Kushnir Kuschnir (Ukrainian: Кушнір, Belarusian: Кушнір, Russian: Кушни́р, Ку́шнир, Yiddish: קושניר) is a Ukrainian and Jewish occupational surname, meaning furrier, see "Kürschner" for etymology. Notable people with the surname include:

- Alex Kushnir (born 1978), Soviet-born Israeli politician
- Alla Kushnir (1941–2013), Soviet-born Israeli chess Woman Grandmaster
- Anton Kushnir (born 1984), Belarusian aerial skier
- Asher Kushnir, Soviet-born Israeli child-rearing professional
- Avi Kushnir (born 1960), Israeli actor and comedian
- Boris Kuschnir (born 1948), Soviet-born Austrian violinist
- David Kushnir (1931–2020), Israeli Olympic long-jumper
- Pavel Kushnir (1984–2024), Russian pianist and political activist
