= Craig Roberts Stapleton =

American diplomat and businessman

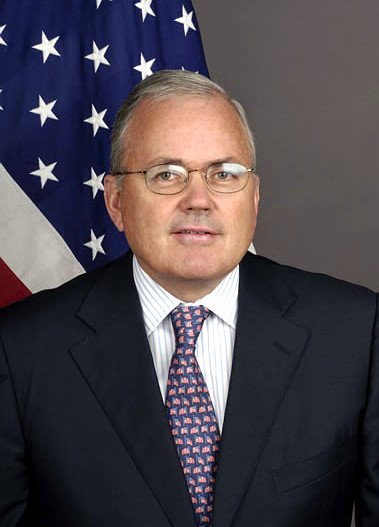

1st United States Ambassador to Monaco
- In office December 13, 2006 – January 29, 2009
- President: George W. Bush
- Preceded by: Office established
- Succeeded by: Charles Rivkin

United States Ambassador to France
- In office July 25, 2005 – January 29, 2009
- President: George W. Bush
- Preceded by: Howard H. Leach
- Succeeded by: Charles Rivkin

4th United States Ambassador to the Czech Republic
- In office August 28, 2001 – December 16, 2003
- President: George W. Bush
- Preceded by: John Shattuck
- Succeeded by: William J. Cabaniss

Personal details
- Born: April 17, 1945 (age 81) Kansas City, Missouri, U.S.
- Party: Republican
- Spouse: Dorothy Walker
- Relations: Benjamin F. Stapleton (paternal grandfather)
- Children: 2, including Walker
- Education: Phillips Exeter Academy
- Alma mater: Harvard University
- Occupation: Diplomat, Businessman

Craig Roberts Stapleton (born April 17, 1945) is an American diplomat and businessman. He served as Ambassador to France, Monaco, Mexico, and the Czech Republic during the administrations of President George W. Bush.

== Biography ==
=== Early life ===
Craig Stapleton was born in Kansas City, Missouri, the son of Katherine Histed Hall and Benjamin Franklin Stapleton Jr. His grandfather, Benjamin F. Stapleton, was a politician who served five terms as mayor of Denver. He received his secondary school education at Phillips Exeter Academy and a B.A. (magna cum laude) from Harvard University. He received his M.B.A. from Harvard Business School. His wife, Dorothy Walker Stapleton, is a first cousin of former U.S. president George H. W. Bush.

=== Career ===
Stapleton served as President of Marsh and McLennan Real Estate Advisors of New York from 1982 until 2001. From 1989 to 1998 Stapleton co-owned the Texas Rangers baseball team with George W. Bush. He has served on the board of directors for several companies including Allegheny Properties, Metro PCS, TB Woods, Winston Partners and Abercrombie & Fitch. In July 2009, he became a co-owner of the St. Louis Cardinals.

Under George H.W. Bush, Stapleton sat on the Board of the Peace Corps. During the first administration of George W. Bush he served as Ambassador to the Czech Republic. In 2004, he was the Connecticut State Chairman for the Bush-Cheney reelection campaign. From 2005-2009 he was Ambassador to France.

Stapleton is a Senior Advisor to Stone Point Capital and a Director of Tenax Aerospace. He serves on the boards of the Vaclav Havel Foundation, the American Friends of Compiegne, the United Way Tocqueville of France, the 9/11 Memorial & Museum, the World War I Centennial Commission, and the Trust for the National Mall. He is a Trustee of the American University in Paris, the CERGE-EI Foundation, and the Fishback Foundation. He has served on the Visiting Committee for Harvard College Athletics and the Committee on University Resources and Athletics.

=== Personal life ===
Stapleton married Dorothy Walker at St. John's Episcopal Church, West Hartford, Connecticut on October 16, 1971. He and his wife live in North Palm Beach, Florida and have two adult children; his son Walker Stapleton was elected Colorado State Treasurer in 2010.

Diplomatic posts
Preceded by John Shattuck	U.S. Ambassador to the Czech Republic; 2001–2004	Succeeded by William J. Cabaniss
Preceded by Howard H. Leach	U.S. Ambassador to France; 2005–2009	Succeeded by Charles Rivkin
Preceded by New office	U.S. Ambassador to Monaco; 2006–2009	Succeeded by Charles Rivkin
