= Howard Gutman =

American lawyer and diplomat (born 1956)

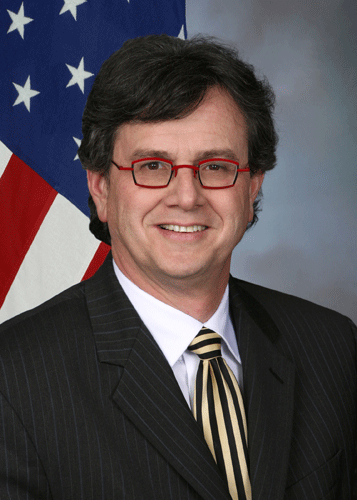
- Gutman in 2009

33rd United States Ambassador to Belgium
- In office August 14, 2009 – July 23, 2013
- President: Barack Obama
- Preceded by: Sam Fox
- Succeeded by: Denise Bauer

Personal details
- Born: Howard William Gutman; July 8, 1956 (age 70) New York City, U.S.
- Party: Democratic
- Spouse: Michelle Phyllis Loewinger
- Education: Columbia University; Harvard Law School
- Occupation: Ambassador; actor; attorney

Howard William Gutman (born July 8, 1956) is a lawyer, actor and former United States Ambassador to Belgium under Barack Obama from 2009 to 2013.

== Early life and education ==
Gutman is the son of Polish immigrant and Holocaust survivor Max Gutman, who worked in New York's garment district. He attended public elementary schools and then the Bronx High School of Science in New York. Gutman is a summa cum laude graduate of Columbia University (1977) and a magna cum laude graduate of Harvard Law School (1980).

== Career ==
=== Lawyer ===
Gutman clerked for Judge Irving Loeb Goldberg on the United States Court of Appeals for the Fifth Circuit (1980–1981). After that, he joined the law firm of Cravath, Swaine & Moore. He left the firm to clerk for Justice Potter Stewart on the United States Supreme Court.

After clerking, in 1982, Gutman joined the Washington, D.C., law firm of Williams & Connolly LLP. He left the firm in 1985 to become Special Assistant to F.B.I. Director William H. Webster, focusing on counter-intelligence and counter-terrorism. Gutman rejoined Williams & Connolly in 1986, and in 1988, Gutman became a partner at the firm, where he focused on commercial litigation, including securities, contracts, antitrust, labor, banking, real estate, intellectual property, insurance coverage, international law, and partnership disputes.

Gutman represented a wide variety of clients during his 25-year career, including acting Secretary of State Lawrence Eagleburger and many states' attorneys general in suits against Microsoft Corporation. Gutman also once represented Susan Rosenberg, a former member of the Weather Underground accused, but never indicted or convicted, in the 1981 Brinks robbery in post-conviction, constitutional litigation. Gutman also provided representation to Gonzalo Sánchez de Lozada, a former Bolivian president, and José Carlos Sánchez Berzain, a defense minister, who were sued in American courts by Bolivians following an attempted coup in Bolivia. The United States Court of Appeals for the Eleventh Circuit recently dismissed the case against Sánchez de Lozada and Sánchez Berzain.

=== Politics ===
Gutman has long been active in Democratic politics, working on policy issues, speech writing, constituency work, legal representation, and media. He also has helped raise money for Democratic presidential, gubernatorial, and congressional candidates, including Al Gore's presidential campaign in 2000. Gutman served on the legal team representing Gore in the Supreme Court case Bush v. Gore.

According to OpenSecrets.org, in 2008, Gutman was part of the Obama National Finance Committee and later a trustee on the Presidential Inauguration Committee. Gutman and his wife, Michelle Loewinger, have contributed at least $86,150 to Democratic candidates, parties and committees since 1989. Gutman contributed the legal maximum of $2300 to Bill Clinton's presidential bid. Both he and his wife contributed the legal maximum of $4600 a piece to Obama's presidential run. Gutman bundled at least half a million for Obama's campaign committee and another $275,000 for his inauguration.

=== Ambassadorship to Belgium ===
Gutman has been dubbed by one Belgian newspaper as "the most popular ambassador ever in Belgium" and is the second longest serving U.S. Ambassador to Belgium in the last 35 years. The Flemish municipality of Buggenhout erected a monument marking the ambassador's visit to the municipality. U.S. Senator Patrick Leahy (D-Vt) placed Gutman's poem, given on Memorial Day at Flanders Field, into the Congressional Record. Among his 100+ television appearances in Belgium, Gutman was chosen to present the final award at the Belgian Music Industry Awards. On September 7, 2011, Le Soir, a leading Belgian newspaper, ran a major profile entitled: "The Ambassador Who Makes Us Love America Again." Noting the change in Belgian-American relations, one Belgian newspaper stated that "there is no doubt that [Ambassador Gutman] would be elected if he were to run at a [Belgian] election."

He also had the goal of visiting each of the 589 municipalities in Belgium. His intention was not only to visit managers and politicians, but also ordinary citizens and employees. On May 5, 2013, he completed his tour when he visited the last municipality on his list, Voeren. Gutman left his post as ambassador on July 23, 2013.

=== Antisemitism speech ===
Speaking at a legal conference on antisemitism organized by the European Jewish Union on November 30, 2011, Gutman talked about historic antisemitism, as well as a trend he described as "a tension and perhaps hatred largely born of and reflecting the tension ... in the Middle East over the continuing Israeli-Palestinian problem". He added that "an Israeli-Palestinian peace treaty will significantly diminish Muslim anti-Semitism." The comments were then misquoted in what Salon, The Economist and Mother Jones then demonstrated was a "woefully inaccurate account of his remarks." Reliance on the misquotes led to high-profile criticism from a number of rival politicians, including Republican presidential candidates Newt Gingrich, Mitt Romney and Rick Perry as well as Abraham Foxman of the Anti-Defamation League. Gutman issued a statement saying, "I deeply regret if my comments were taken the wrong way", highlighting his history of condemning and combating anti-semitism, and making reference to his background as the son of a Holocaust survivor. The subsequent press demonstrated both that Ambassador Gutman had been misquoted and the accuracy of his speech. Lubavitch Chabad leader Rabbi Levi Shemtov also came to the defense of Ambassador Gutman, citing his service to the Jewish community and noting that calling Ambassador Gutman an "anti-Semite" was like calling Rabbi Shemtov an "astronaut." At the end of his ambassadorship, Ambassador Gutman won the European Jewish Union Building's Prize for Friendship and Service to the Jewish Community. Currently, Howard Gutman is on the Regional Board of the American Jewish Committee Washington D.C.

=== Allegations of sexual misconduct ===
An alleged State Department whistleblower alleged that an Inspector General's report accused Gutman of soliciting prostitutes and minors for sex while serving as ambassador, but that Undersecretary of State Patrick F. Kennedy ordered it removed from the report. Gutman denied the accusations as "baseless" and the State Department adamantly denied that any allegations of questionable or illegal behavior by diplomats have been covered up, and that any proven wrongdoing would be punished administratively or prosecuted criminally. On June 11, 2013, White House Press Secretary Jay Carney confirmed that the allegations were under active investigation by an independent inspector general. Despite these allegations, Gutman served his full term, including representing the United States at the invocation of the new Belgian King on July 21, 2013. On June 21, 2013, the White House announced Denise Bauer as the new nominee to be the next U.S. ambassador to Belgium.

After his completion of service, when he was free to talk, Gutman appeared on a popular Belgian talk show, Reyers Laat, and addressed the allegations - calling them "nonsense" - towards the end of his ambassadorship and explained his recollection of the events in question. Finally, in October 2014, the State Department investigation cleared Gutman and issued the following Statement in apology: "The Inspector General's report makes clear there was no wrongdoing and that the allegations wrongfully leaked from internal OIG documents were in fact unsubstantiated. It can't erase the pain these leaks caused those public servants who were falsely accused, but it does vindicate them and puts an end to a painful chapter for many. Most importantly, the report concludes there is 'no systemic problem' in the Department's investigations. The irresponsible leaks did not occur on the watch of this Inspector General, but we appreciate that he has brought this difficult story to a conclusion."

== Honors ==
- Belgium:
  - Knight Grand Cross in the Order of the Crown, by RD of King Philippe.
  - Honorary Knight of the Brewers' Paddle. (2011)

== Post Ambassadorship ==
Gutman is currently the Managing Director of The Gutman Group, a consulting, advisory and investment firm focused on resolving corporate issues, fostering cross-border investment, market access, venture capital, international relations and more. The Gutman Group focuses largely on the U.S., Europe, the Middle East and Asia. Gutman also serves on the boards of several companies, including Exmar, a publicly traded LNG/LPG shipper and liquefactor, a DTH Capital, a New York real estate company largely owned by Ageas Insurance as well as several senior advisor positions for both US and European based companies. Gutman is a frequent speaker including at recent investor conferences in London and Copenhagen; delivered the keynote speech at the Brussels Sustainable Development Summit in October 2015 and speaks often at annual foundation and organization meetings. He has appeared several times recently on the Fox Network and on Belgian television providing commentary about the 2016 election. Gutman has been awarded the "Grand-Cross in the Order of the Crown", the second highest civilian medal awarded by Belgium.

== Popular culture ==
=== In the press ===
Gutman wrote a first-person account of the time in Belgium, reviewing the successes and the difficulties of public service in the age of bloggers. The story was covered in the Washington Post Sunday magazine on July 19, 2015. In the article, Gutman revealed that during the flotilla dispute between Israel and Turkey, President of Turkey Recep Tayyip Erdoğan secretly sent a Turkish Minister to Belgium to ask him to open a back-channel negotiation between Turkey and Israel.

=== Media appearances ===
Among the media work Gutman performed during the 2008 U.S. presidential campaign, Gutman was a frequent contributor to Fox News. Gutman also acted in several episodes of the HBO series K Street, Tim Robbins' film Noise and the 2009 film Fame. Gutman has also been heard on "The Kevin Sheehan Show" Podcast as a legal analyst.

== See also ==
- List of law clerks for the eighth seat of the Supreme Court of the United States

Diplomatic posts
Preceded by Wayne Bush	United States Ambassador to Belgium; 2009–2013	Succeeded by Denise Bauer
