= List of ambassadors of the United States to France =

Ambassador of the United States of America to France
- Ambassadeur des États-Unis en France
- Seal of the United States Department of State

- Flag of the United States ambassador

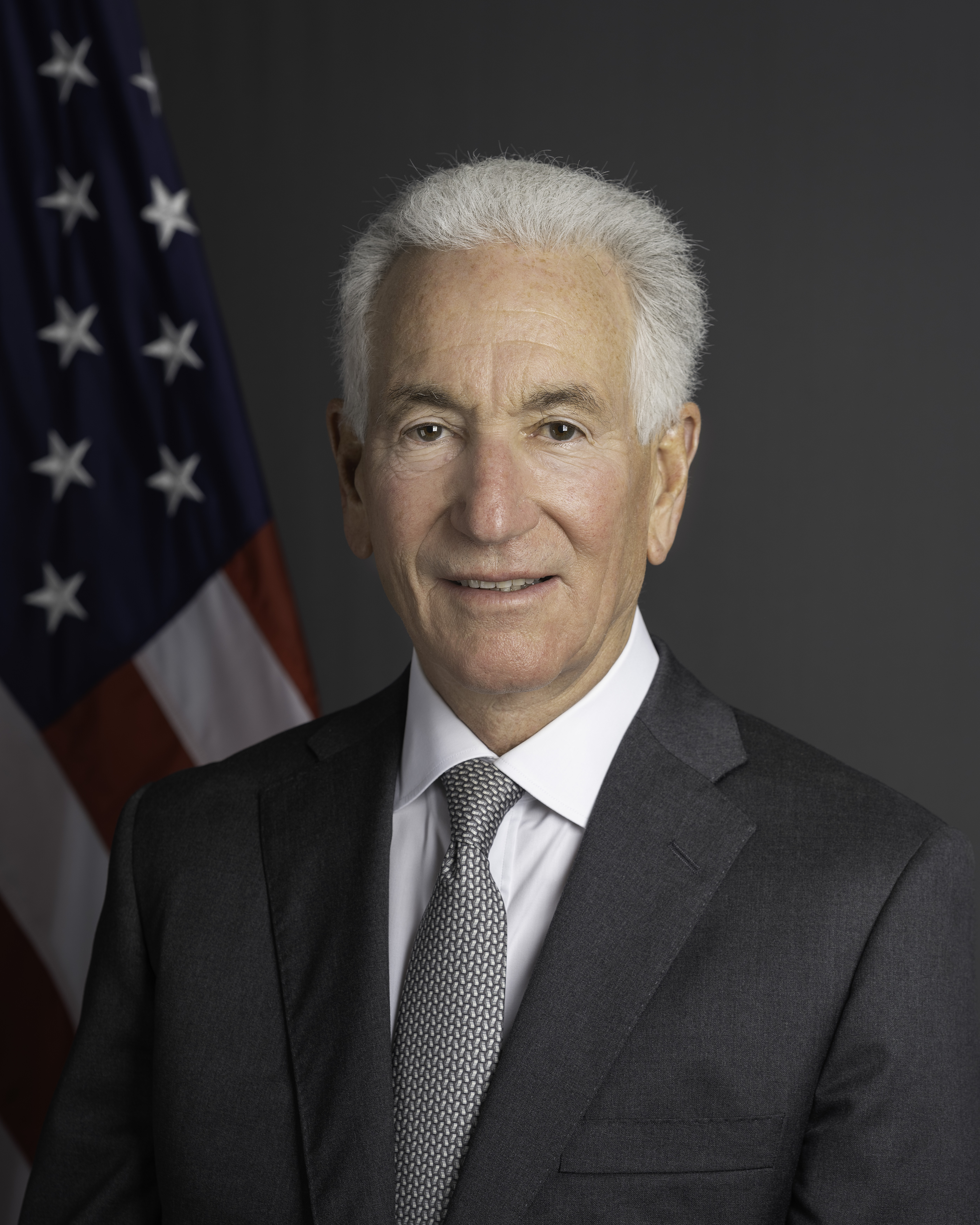
- Incumbent; Charles Kushner since July 11, 2025
- U.S. Department of State
- Style: Mr. or Madam Ambassador
- Reports to: United States Secretary of State
- Residence: Hôtel de Pontalba
- Seat: Embassy of the United States, Paris, France
- Appointer: President of the United States; with the advice and consent of the Senate
- Term length: At the pleasure of the president
- Inaugural holder: Benjamin Franklin (as Envoy)
- Formation: 1778
- Website: fr.usembassy.gov

The United States ambassador to France is the official representative of the president of the United States to the president of France. The United States has maintained diplomatic relations with France since the American Revolution. Relations were upgraded to the higher rank of Ambassador in 1893. The diplomatic relationship has continued through France's two empires, three monarchies, and five republics. Since 2006 the ambassador to France has also served as the ambassador to Monaco.

== List of United States chiefs of mission in France ==
=== Ministers to the Court of Versailles (1778–1792) ===
Relations between the United States and the French Court of Versailles were established in 1778 with the signing of the Treaty of Amity and Commerce. As a republic, the United States was not entitled to send an ambassador. Instead, relations were maintained at the lower diplomatic rank of Minister. The position was formally known as the Minister Plenipotentiary from the United States of America at the Court of Versailles.

Name		Appointment	Presentation	Termination	Notes
Benjamin Franklin	Benjamin Franklin	September 14, 1778	March 23, 1779	May 17, 1785	Franklin had represented the United States unofficially since December 1776, prior to France recognizing American Independence.
	Thomas Jefferson	March 10, 1785	May 17, 1785	September 26, 1789	
	William Short	April 20, 1790	June 14, 1790	May 15, 1792	
	Gouverneur Morris	January 12, 1792	June 3, 1792	April 9, 1794	Remained as Minister after the First Republic was proclaimed. Mission terminated when the French government requested his recall.

=== Ministers to the First Republic (1792–1804) ===
Name		Appointment	Presentation	Termination	Notes
James Monroe	James Monroe	May 28, 1794	August 15, 1794	December 9, 1796	
	Charles C. Pinckney	September 9, 1796	Not presented	February 5, 1797	

Diplomatic relations were broken in 1796 due to French anger at U.S. neutrality in the War of the First Coalition. After the Directory refused to accept Charles Cotesworth Pinckney's credentials, a commission was appointed to negotiate with the French Republic. The members of the commission — Pinckney, John Marshall, and Elbridge Gerry — were all accredited with the rank of Envoy Extraordinary and Minister Plenipotentiary. French officials demanded a bribe before they would commence negotiations, scuttling the mission in the XYZ Affair. Hostilities culminated in the outbreak of the Quasi-War between the U.S. and France. Diplomatic relations were restored with the Convention of 1800.

Name	Appointment	Presentation	Termination	Notes
Robert R. Livingston	October 2, 1801	December 6, 1801	November 18, 1804	Remained as Minister after Napoleon Bonaparte was proclaimed emperor.

James Monroe was accredited Minister Plenipotentiary to the French Republic in 1803 to negotiate the Louisiana Purchase. However, Robert Livingston remained chief of mission.

=== Ministers to the Court of the Tuilleries (1804–1848) ===
Since Versailles had been stripped of its furnishings during the French Revolution, Napoleon I returned the French court to its pre-1682 home at the Tuilleries. U.S. ministers to all future French monarchs would be accredited to the Tuilleries. After the Congress of Vienna standardized the system of diplomatic ranks, the United States continued to send a Minister, who was officially credentialed as an Envoy Extraordinary and Minister Plenipotentiary.

Name	Appointment	Presentation	Termination	Notes
John Armstrong	June 30, 1804	November 18, 1804	September 14, 1810	
Joel Barlow	February 27, 1811	November 17, 1811	December 26, 1812	Died in Żarnowiec during the French retreat from Moscow.
William H. Crawford	April 9, 1813	December 14, 1813; August 16, 1814	April 26, 1815 to April 30, 1815	
Albert Gallatin	February 28, 1815	July 16, 1816	May 16, 1823	
James Brown	December 9, 1823	April 13, 1824	June 28, 1829	
William Cabell Rives	April 18, 1829	October 25, 1829; January 14, 1831	September 27, 1832	
Edward Livingston	May 29, 1833	September 30, 1833	April 29, 1835	
Lewis Cass	October 4, 1836	December 1, 1836	November 12, 1842	
William R. King	April 9, 1844	July 1, 1844	September 15, 1846	
Richard Rush	March 3, 1847	July 31, 1847; April 26, 1848	October 8, 1849	Reaccredited to the Second Republic.

=== Ministers to the Second Republic (1848–1852) ===
Name	Appointment	Presentation	Termination	Notes
William Cabell Rives	July 20, 1849	November 8, 1849; January 10, 1853	May 12, 1853	Reaccredited to the Second Empire.

=== Ministers to the Court of the Tuilleries (1852–1870) ===
Name	Appointment	Presentation	Termination	Notes
John Y. Mason	October 10, 1853	January 22, 1854	October 3, 1859	Died at post.
Charles J. Faulkner	January 16, 1860	March 4, 1860	May 12, 1861	Sided with the Confederacy during the American Civil War.
William L. Dayton	March 18, 1861	May 19, 1861	December 1, 1864	Died at post.
John Bigelow	March 15, 1865	April 23, 1865	December 23, 1866	
John Adams Dix	September 24, 1866	December 23, 1866	May 23, 1869	
Elihu B. Washburne	March 17, 1869	May 23, 1869; May 8, 1871	September 5, 1877	Reaccredited to the Third Republic.

=== Ministers to the Third Republic (1870–1893) ===
Name	Appointment	Presentation	Termination	Notes
Edward F. Noyes	July 1, 1877	September 5, 1877	August 5, 1881	
Levi P. Morton	March 21, 1881	August 5, 1881	May 14, 1885	
Robert M. McLane	March 23, 1885	May 14, 1885	May 20, 1889	
Whitelaw Reid	March 23, 1889	May 21, 1889	March 25, 1892	
T. Jefferson Coolidge	May 12, 1892	June 10, 1892	May 4, 1893	

=== Ambassadors to the Third Republic (1893–1942) ===
After it became a republic, France continued to exchange ambassadors with other Great Powers. This put an end to the longstanding rule that only Great Power monarchies could exchange ambassadors with each other. As the United States grew in population and economic strength, it followed the French example. In 1893, the United States upgraded its diplomatic relations with the other Great Powers to the ambassadorial level.

Name	Appointment	Presentation	Termination	Notes
James B. Eustis	April 8, 1893	May 6, 1893	May 24, 1897	
Horace Porter	March 19, 1897	May 26, 1897	May 2, 1905	
Robert S. McCormick	March 8, 1905	May 2, 1905	March 2, 1907	
Henry White	December 19, 1906	March 23, 1907	November 3, 1909	
Robert Bacon	December 21, 1909	December 31, 1909	April 19, 1912	
Myron T. Herrick	February 15, 1912	April 29, 1912	November 28, 1914	
William Graves Sharp	June 19, 1914	December 4, 1914	April 14, 1919	
Hugh Campbell Wallace	February 27, 1919	April 22, 1919	July 5, 1921	
Myron T. Herrick	April 16, 1921	July 15, 1921	March 31, 1929	Died at post.
Walter Evans Edge	November 21, 1929	December 18, 1929	April 13, 1933	
Jesse I. Straus	March 17, 1933	June 8, 1933	August 5, 1936	
William C. Bullitt Jr.	August 25, 1936	October 13, 1936	July 11, 1940	
William D. Leahy	November 29, 1940	January 8, 1941	May 1, 1942	Departed Vichy France; S. Pinkney Tuck served as interim chargé d'affaires until Vichy France severed diplomatic relations with the U.S. on November 8, 1942.

=== Ambassadors to the Provisional Government of the French Republic (1944-1946) ===
Name	Appointment	Presentation	Termination	Notes
Jefferson Caffery	November 25, 1944	December 30, 1944	May 13, 1949	The Embassy in Paris had been opened back to the public after the liberation of France on December 1, 1944, with Ambassador Caffery in charge pending presentation of his letter of credence. French actual regime at this time is officially called PGFR. Transferred to the Fourth Republic after French people ratified the Constitution of 1946.

=== Ambassadors to the Fourth Republic (1946–1958) ===
Name	Appointment	Presentation	Termination	Notes
David K. E. Bruce	May 9, 1949	May 17, 1949	March 10, 1952	
James Clement Dunn	March 13, 1952	March 27, 1952	March 2, 1953	
C. Douglas Dillon	February 27, 1953	March 13, 1953	January 28, 1957	
Amory Houghton	March 14, 1957	April 17, 1957	January 19, 1961	Transferred to the Fifth Republic after French people ratified the Constitution of 1958.

=== Ambassadors to the Fifth Republic (since 1958) ===
Name	Appointment	Presentation	Termination	Notes
James M. Gavin	February 22, 1961	March 21, 1961	September 26, 1962	
Charles E. Bohlen	September 4, 1962	October 27, 1962	February 9, 1968	
Sargent Shriver	April 22, 1968	May 25, 1968	March 25, 1970	
Arthur K. Watson	April 8, 1970	May 6, 1970	October 30, 1972	
John N. Irwin II	February 2, 1973	March 23, 1973	October 20, 1974	
Kenneth Rush	September 19, 1974	November 21, 1974	March 14, 1977	
Arthur A. Hartman	June 8, 1977	July 7, 1977	October 14, 1981	
Evan G. Galbraith	November 6, 1981	December 2, 1981	July 15, 1985	
Joe M. Rodgers	July 19, 1985	September 20, 1985	January 8, 1989	
Walter Curley	May 12, 1989	July 6, 1989	February 11, 1993	
Pamela Harriman	May 8, 1993	June 30, 1993	February 5, 1997	Died at post.
Felix Rohatyn	August 1, 1997	September 11, 1997	December 7, 2000	
Howard H. Leach	July 12, 2001	September 4, 2001	April 16, 2005	
Craig Roberts Stapleton	June 21, 2005	July 25, 2005	January 29, 2009	Also accredited to Monaco.
Charles Rivkin	June 1, 2009	October 2, 2009	November 20, 2013	Also accredited to Monaco.
Jane D. Hartley	September 26, 2014	October 31, 2014	January 20, 2017	Also accredited to Monaco.
Jamie McCourt	November 20, 2017	December 18, 2017	January 20, 2021	Also accredited to Monaco.
Denise Bauer	December 18, 2021	February 5, 2022	January 20, 2025	Also accredited to Monaco.
Charles Kushner	May 19, 2025	July 11, 2025	Incumbent	Also accredited to Monaco.

== See also ==
- List of French ambassadors to the United States
- Embassy of the United States, Paris
- France – United States relations
- Foreign relations of France
- Ambassadors of the United States
