= Denise Bauer =

American diplomat (born 1964)

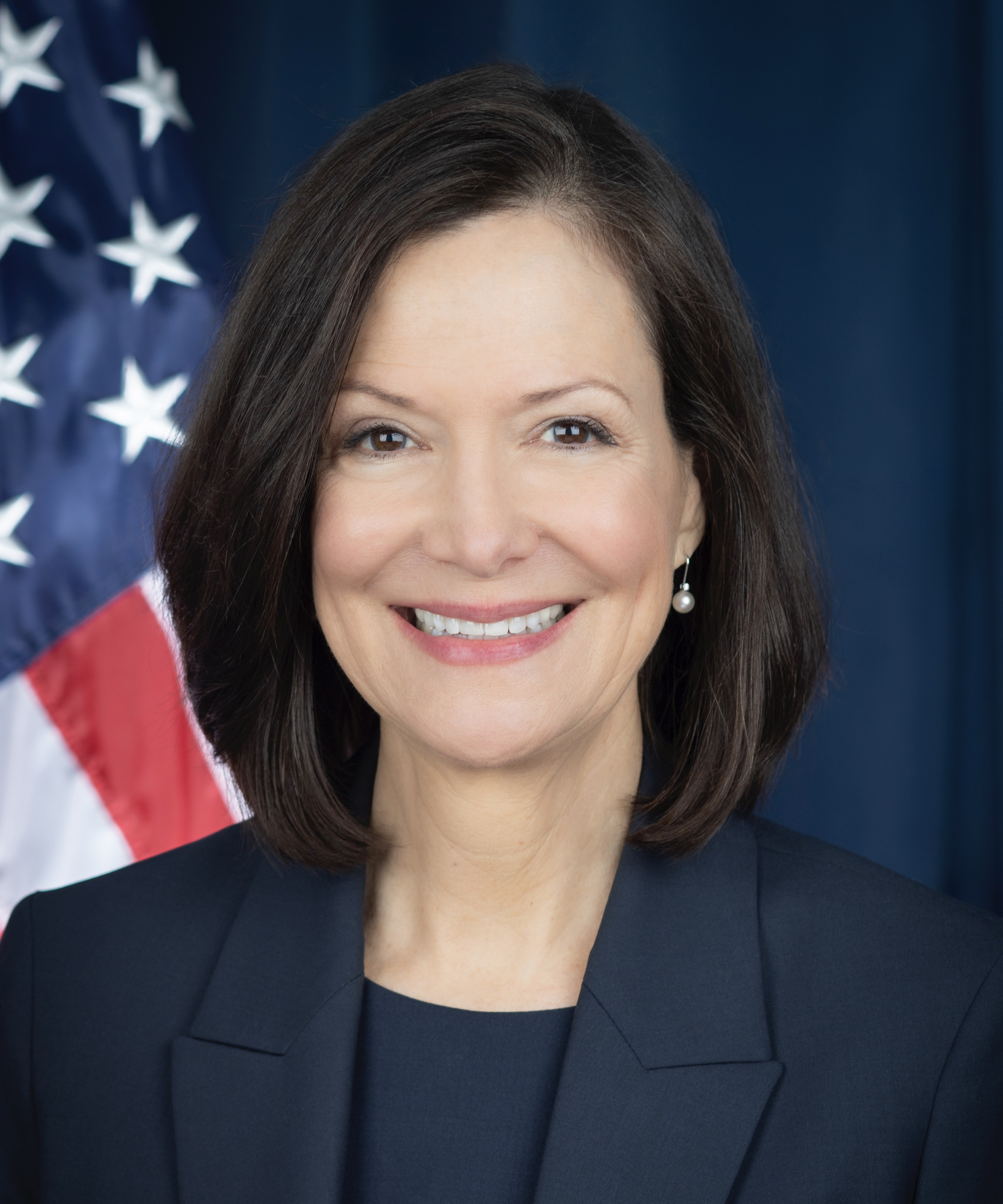
- Official portrait, 2022

United States Ambassador to France and Monaco
- In office February 5, 2022 – January 20, 2025
- President: Joe Biden
- Preceded by: Jamie McCourt
- Succeeded by: Charles Kushner

United States Ambassador to Belgium
- In office September 26, 2013 – January 20, 2017
- President: Barack Obama
- Preceded by: Howard Gutman
- Succeeded by: Ronald Gidwitz

Personal details
- Born: Denise Campbell Bauer; January 30, 1964 (age 62)
- Party: Democratic
- Spouse: Steven M. Bauer
- Children: 2
- Education: Occidental College (BA)

Denise Campbell Bauer (born January 30, 1964) is an American diplomat who has twice served as a United States ambassador in Europe. From 2021 to 2025, she served as the United States Ambassador to France and Monaco after being nominated by President Joseph Biden. From 2013 to 2017, she served as the United States Ambassador to Belgium after being nominated by President Barack Obama.

== Education ==
Bauer graduated from Occidental College in 1986 with a Bachelor of Arts degree in political science, with an emphasis in foreign affairs and national security.

== Career ==
She began her career in television news in Los Angeles, where she worked as a field producer and researcher for KCBS-TV News from 1985 to 1988, as a news producer for the North American bureau of Nine Network Australia from 1988 to 1990, and as a freelance film and video producer from 1990 to 1992. From 1993 until 1994 she worked as a public affairs officer for the American Red Cross Bay Area in San Francisco. Bauer has been active in public service and community engagement for the past 25 years and, among other positions, served as president of the board of directors of the Belvedere Community Foundation, located in Belvedere, California.

Bauer was the executive director of Women for Biden during the 2020 presidential campaign. Previously, she served on the Obama for America National Finance Committee from 2007 to 2008 and from 2011 to 2012. She was finance chair for Women for Obama from 2011 to 2012. She was also on the Democratic National Committee from 2008 to 2012, serving as chair and co-chair of the Women’s Leadership Forum and as co-chair of the National Issues Conference. She has also reportedly contributed nearly $20,000 to Democratic candidates and organizations.

=== Ambassador to Belgium ===
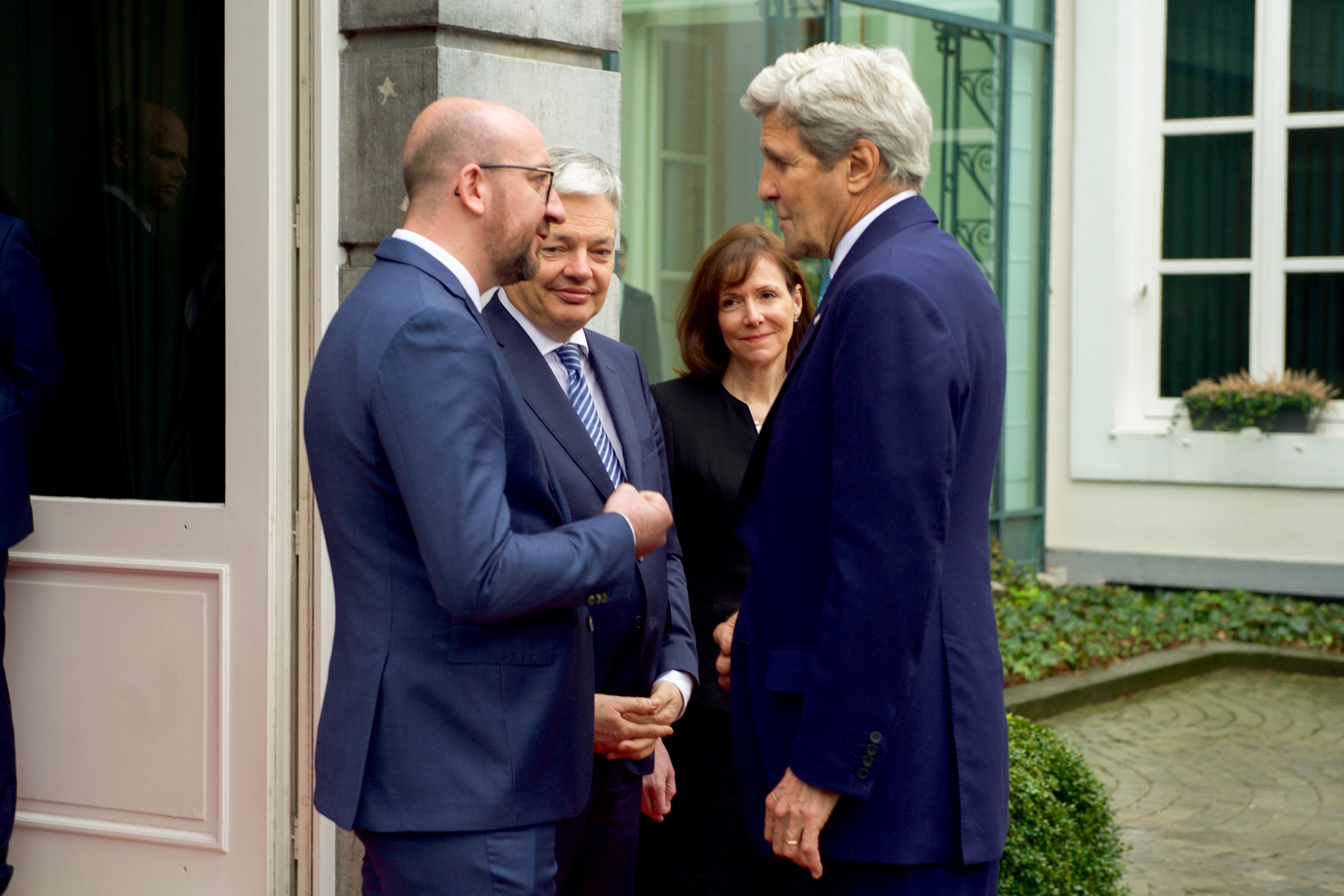
Bauer with Belgian Prime Minister Charles Michel, Foreign Minister Didier Reynders and U.S. Secretary of State John Kerry in Brussels, Belgium on March 25, 2016

On June 21, 2013, Bauer was nominated to be the next US ambassador to Belgium by President Barack Obama. Hearings on her nomination were held before the Senate Foreign Relations Committee on July 25, 2013. The committee reported her favorably on July 30, 2013. On August 2, 2013, the Senate confirmed her unanimously by voice vote. She presented her credentials to King Philippe of Belgium in 2013 and served as ambassador until 2017.

=== Ambassador to France ===
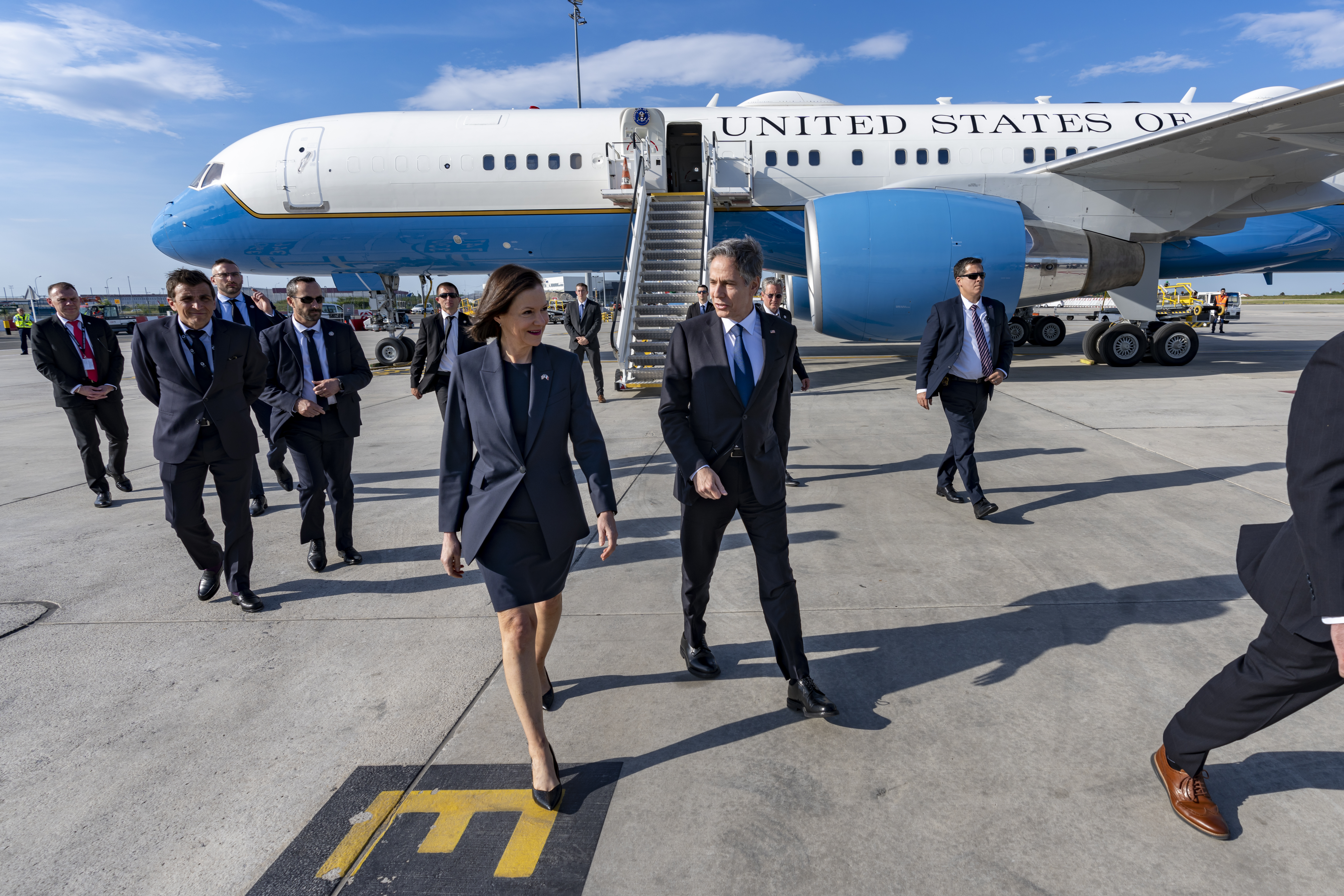
Bauer greets U.S. Secretary of State Antony Blinken in Paris, France on May 15, 2022

In June 2021, it was reported that President Joe Biden would nominate Bauer to serve as the United States Ambassador to France and Monaco. On July 9, 2021, President Biden formally nominated her. On September 15, 2021, a hearing on her nomination was held before the Senate Foreign Relations Committee. On October 19, 2021, her nomination was reported favorably out of committee. The United States Senate confirmed her on December 18, 2021, by voice vote. She was sworn in on December 23, 2021. She presented her credentials to President Emmanuel Macron on February 5, 2022. In 2025, President Emmanuel Macron awarded her the rank of Commander in the French National Order of the Legion of Honor.

=== Ambassador to Monaco ===
Bauer presented her credentials to Prince Albert II on September 29, 2022.

== Personal life ==
Bauer is married to attorney Steven M. Bauer, who is a retired litigation partner in the firm of Latham & Watkins in San Francisco. They have two daughters, Katherine and Natalie. She speaks French.

Diplomatic posts
Preceded by Howard Gutman	United States Ambassador to Belgium; 2013–2017	Succeeded by Ronald Gidwitz
Preceded by Jamie McCourt	United States Ambassador to France; 2022–2025	Succeeded by Charles Kushner
