= Jamie McCourt =

American diplomat, attorney, & executive (born 1953)

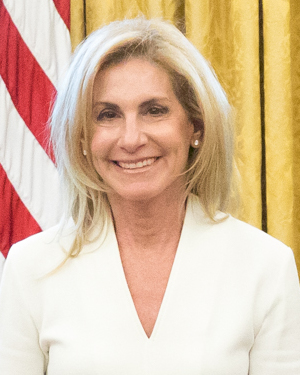
- Jamie McCourt in 2017

United States Ambassador to France and Monaco
- In office December 18, 2017 – January 20, 2021
- President: Donald Trump
- Preceded by: Jane D. Hartley
- Succeeded by: Denise Bauer

Personal details
- Born: Jamie D. Luskin; December 5, 1953 (age 72) Baltimore, Maryland, U.S.
- Party: Republican
- Spouse: Frank McCourt (m. 1979; div. 2011)
- Education: Georgetown University (BA); University of Maryland, Baltimore (JD); Massachusetts Institute of Technology (MBA)

Jamie D. McCourt (née Luskin; born December 5, 1953) is the former United States Ambassador to France and Monaco who served from 2017 to 2021. She was confirmed by the Senate and sworn in on November 2, 2017. Ambassador McCourt is also the United States Permanent Observer to the Council of Europe. McCourt is the founder and CEO of Jamie Enterprises and a former executive of the Los Angeles Dodgers. She became the highest-ranking woman in Major League Baseball, appointed first as vice chairman of the Dodgers in 2004, then president in 2005, and finally CEO in 2009.

== Early life ==
Jamie McCourt (née Luskin) was born in Baltimore, Maryland, to Jewish parents. Her father, Jack Luskin, ran the Luskin's chain of appliance stores in Maryland. As a 17-year-old freshman at Georgetown University, she met Frank McCourt, whom she would marry in 1979.

== Education ==
McCourt earned a B.A. degree in French at Georgetown University (1975), a J.D. degree at the University of Maryland School of Law (1978) and an M.B.A. degree from the MIT Sloan School of Management. She also attended La Sorbonne and studied culinary arts in Aix-en-Provence.

== Career ==
For fifteen years she was a practicing attorney, engaged in international and securities law in New York City as well as in corporate, real estate, and family law in Boston. She then spent ten years as vice president and general counsel of the McCourt Co., the family real estate development firm in Boston.

She relocated from Boston to Los Angeles in 2004 to purchase the Los Angeles Dodgers and also joined the Dodgers' front-office organization as an executive after the team was acquired.

In September 2008, the McCourts purchased the Los Angeles Marathon.

She was a visiting professor at the UCLA Anderson School of Management. Her course, "The Pursuit of Leadership: A Female Perspective," was designed for women and, according to the UCLA Newsroom, was considered one of the most popular courses in the Anderson School curriculum.

In 2009, McCourt launched Jamie Enterprises. She has invested in high-value real estate, biotech and tech start ups. Investments include ZipCar, Kite Pharma and Heal.

In 2013, she bought a 22-acre vineyard estate in Napa Valley, California Rutherford region for $11.25 million with the intention of both living there part-time and continuing to produce the property's wine. As of 2016, she planned to produce a cabernet sauvignon for release in 2017.

In 2015, she was a keynote speaker at the Sloan Women in Management conference at MIT where she shared her personal story and called for women to seek a secure financial future. McCourt also spoke at institutions such as Harvard and Columbia University encouraging women to be financially self-sufficient and in control of their finances.

In 2016, McCourt served as Presidential Trustee and California State Co-chair for Trump Victory. She then was on the Transition Finance Committee for then President-Elect Donald Trump.

== Los Angeles Dodgers ==
In 2004, the McCourts purchased the Los Angeles Dodgers. From 2004 to 2012, McCourt was the president and CEO of the Dodgers. She began as vice chairman, became president in 2005 and then CEO in 2009. Under her leadership, the Dodgers set a club record for single season attendance and won back-to back division titles for the first time in 30 years.

In October and November 2009 the McCourts separated and later commenced divorce proceedings. Frank McCourt claiming in a 664-page court filing that he fired Jamie McCourt as the club's chief executive in part for having an affair with her driver, who was employed by the Dodgers. His attorneys also alleged that the two spent 2 1/2 weeks in France that summer and billed the team for the trip. Their respective attorneys publicly identified a dispute as to whether the Dodgers assets were community property (i.e. owned 50% by Jamie McCourt), or were separate property, 100% owned by Frank McCourt. The team and stadium assets were purchased for $430 million in 2004 and were valued at $722 million in 2009 (according to Forbes), a theoretical increase in value of $292 million (68%) in five years.

Jamie McCourt was represented in the divorce by trial lawyer David Boies. On December 7, 2010, Superior Court Judge Gordon ruled that a postnuptial agreement giving Frank McCourt sole ownership was invalid due to a switched document proving Jamie's 50% ownership of the Los Angeles Dodgers.

On October 17, 2011, it was announced that the McCourts had reached a settlement dividing their assets equally whereby Jamie McCourt would receive about $130 million and renounce her claims on the team. This settlement ended what is widely believed to be the costliest divorce in California history. Three months later, Frank McCourt sold the Dodgers for $2.1 billion. Jamie McCourt sued Frank for $770 million in 2013, alleging that he had undervalued the team during the divorce settlement.

== Philanthropy ==
McCourt's philanthropy focuses on promoting business education, contemporary art, and the worldwide Jewish community.

McCourt was the recipient of the Scopus Award, the highest humanitarian honor given by the American Friends of the Hebrew University for community leaders who have active involvement in humanitarian causes. In 2012, she was among those who helped Los Angeles County Museum of Art (LACMA) raise $2.8 million to acquire new artworks at the museum's annual Collectors Committee weekend.

=== Board appointments ===
McCourt has served on the board of trustees of the Los Angeles County Museum of Art and on the board of trustees of the Museum of Contemporary Art. She has also served on the board of directors of the Wallis Annenberg Center for the Performing Arts.

McCourt has said she considers education the great equalizer, and has pursued a variety of educational endeavors including membership on the board of advisors at the UCLA Anderson School of Management and the North American Executive Board at the MIT Sloan School of Management. She also served as chairman of Georgetown University's Third Century Campaign, which raised more than one billion dollars.

== United States Ambassador to France and Monaco ==
On June 22, 2017, President Donald Trump nominated McCourt as United States Ambassador to Belgium. On August 2, 2017, Trump withdrew this nomination and instead nominated her as Ambassador to France and Monaco. The Senate confirmed her to these posts on November 2, 2017, by voice vote. She was sworn in on December 11, 2017, and presented her credentials to President Emmanuel Macron on December 18, 2017. McCourt stepped down as ambassador after the inauguration of President Joe Biden in 2021.

== Honors and awards ==
Commander of the Order of Legion of Honour (2026)

Sporting positions
Preceded by Bob Graziano	President of the Los Angeles Dodgers; 2004–2009	Succeeded by Dennis Mannion
Diplomatic posts
Preceded by Jane D. Hartley	United States Ambassador to France; 2017–2021	Succeeded by Denise Bauer
