= Joseph Kushner =

Polish-born American real estate developer (1922–1985)

- Born: Yossel Berkowitz; 10 October 1922; Nowogródek, Poland (now Navahrudak, Belarus)
- Died: 5 October 1985 (aged 62); New Jersey, U.S.
- Citizenship: Polish; American (naturalized)
- Occupation: Real estate magnate
- Spouse: Reichel "Rae" Kushner (m. 1945; died 1985)
- Children: 3, including Murray and Charles
- Family: Kushner

Joseph Kushner (born Yossel Berkowitz; 10 October 1922 – 5 October 1985) was a Polish-born American real estate investor and developer. At the end of his career, he owned over 4,000 apartments, houses, and properties. He was the patriarch of the Kushner family and the paternal grandfather of Jared Kushner.

== Biography ==
Kushner was born Jossel Berkowitz on 10 October 1922 in Navahrudak (Polish: Nowogródek), in what was then eastern Poland. In August 1945, he married Reichel "Rae" Kushner in Budapest. Rae Kushner was also from the town of Navahrudak, and is remembered for accompanying her brother and up to 360 others to escape through a tunnel from the Navahrudak Ghetto during the Holocaust. Joseph took his wife’s last name upon marriage. Charles Kushner was the chief benefactor of the Museum of Jewish Resistance. In the aftermath of the war, Navahrudak was transferred from Poland to the Byelorussian SSR of the Soviet Union under territorial changes dictated by the Potsdam Agreement. Rae Kushner and her spouse immigrated to the United States as Sh'erit ha-Pletah from the Soviet Union in 1949.

Kushner worked as a carpenter in New Jersey eventually running his own business which was funded by the G.I. Bill and later by the Federal Aid Highway Act of 1956.

The Joseph Kushner Hebrew Academy and the Rae Kushner Yeshiva High School, both in Livingston, New Jersey, are named in their honour.

== Family ==
Kushner was the father of Esther Schulder, Murray Kushner and Charles Kushner, and the grandfather of Jared Kushner, Joshua Kushner, and Marc Kushner.

== See also ==
- Kushner family
