= Jane D. Hartley =

American business executive and diplomat (born 1950)

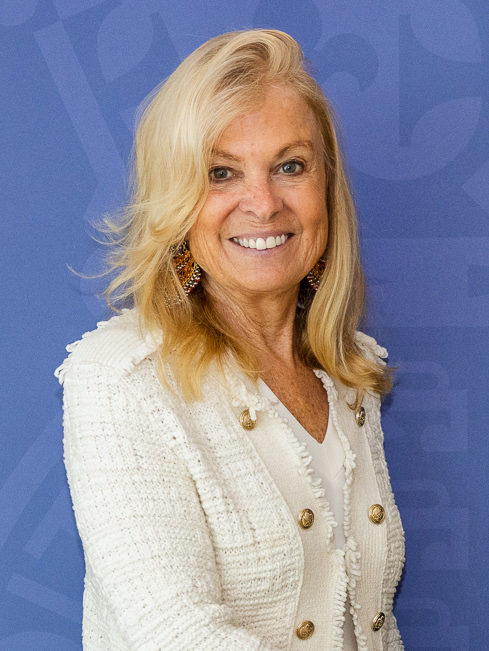
- Hartley in 2022

67th United States Ambassador to the United Kingdom
- In office July 19, 2022 – January 20, 2025
- President: Joe Biden
- Preceded by: Woody Johnson
- Succeeded by: Warren Stephens

United States Ambassador to Monaco
- In office November 5, 2014 – January 20, 2017
- President: Barack Obama
- Preceded by: Charles Rivkin
- Succeeded by: Jamie McCourt

United States Ambassador to France
- In office October 31, 2014 – January 20, 2017
- President: Barack Obama
- Preceded by: Charles Rivkin
- Succeeded by: Jamie McCourt

Personal details
- Born: Jane Dorothy Hartley; April 18, 1950 (age 76) Waterbury, Connecticut, U.S.
- Party: Democratic
- Spouse: Ralph Schlosstein (m. 1983)
- Children: 2
- Education: Newton College of the Sacred Heart

Jane Dorothy Hartley (born April 18, 1950) is an American businesswoman and diplomat who served as the 67th United States ambassador to the United Kingdom under the Biden administration. She had previously served as the U.S. ambassador to France and Monaco from 2014 to 2017 during the Obama administration. Since June 2025, she is chair of the board of trustees of the Carnegie Endowment for International Peace.

Born in Waterbury, Connecticut, Hartley graduated from Newton College of the Sacred Heart in 1972. She has held executive roles at Group W Cable, Westinghouse Broadcasting, and MCA Broadcasting, and later became CEO of the G7 Group and the Observatory Group. Hartley is also a member of the Council on Foreign Relations and has been active in political fundraising and community initiatives.

== Early life and education ==
Hartley was born April 18, 1950, in Waterbury, Connecticut, to Dorothy Hartley (née Maloney; 1910–1999), a real estate broker, and James E. Hartley, who operated a construction company. She graduated with a bachelor's degree from Newton College of the Sacred Heart (now part of Boston College) in 1972.

== Career ==
Hartley began working as the executive director for the Democratic Mayors' Conference for the Democratic National Committee from 1974 until 1977. She then worked as director of congressional relations in the United States Department of Housing and Urban Development from 1977 to 1978. She worked as an associate assistant to the president in the Office of Public Liaison during the administration of President Jimmy Carter, from 1978 until 1981.

From 1981 until 1983, Hartley worked as a vice president for Group W Cable and later as vice president of corporate communications at Westinghouse Broadcasting from 1983 until 1985. She was a vice president of marketing for MCA Broadcasting from 1985 until 1987. From 1987 until 1989, Hartley was station manager of WWOR-TV.

From 1994 until 2007, Hartley worked for the G7 Group, and was CEO from 1995 until 2007. Beginning in 2007, she became the chief executive officer of the Observatory Group, which is an economic and political consulting advisory firm with offices around the world.

On January 26, 2011, President Obama nominated Hartley to serve on the board of the Corporation for National and Community Service. The U.S. Senate confirmed her by unanimous consent on April 26, 2012.

=== Ambassador to France ===
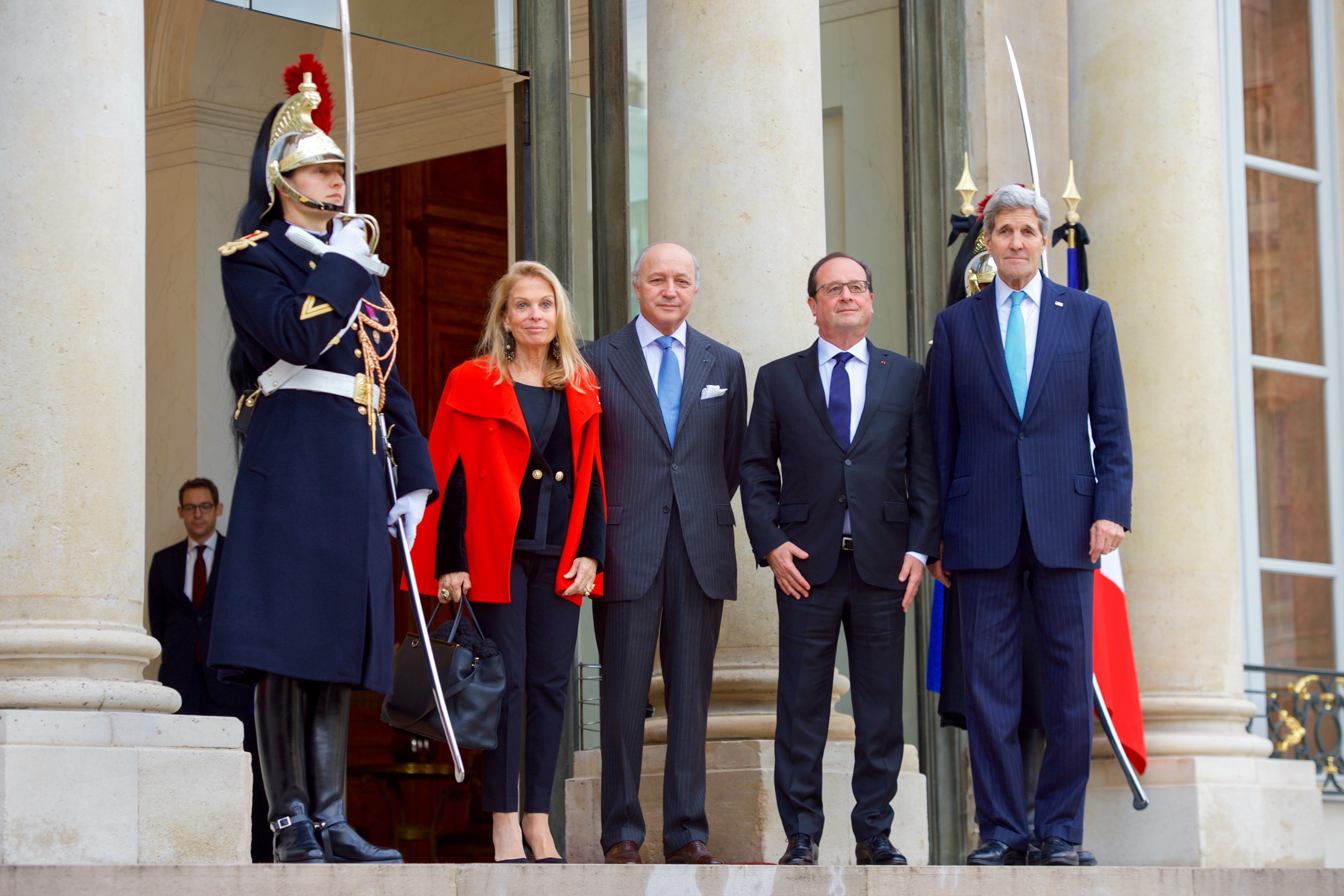
Hartley with French Foreign Minister Laurent Fabius, President François Hollande and U.S. Secretary of State John Kerry in front of the Élysée Palace on November 17, 2015

On June 6, 2014, President Obama nominated Hartley to be the U.S. Ambassador to France on June 9, 2014.

Hearings on her nomination were held before the Senate Foreign Relations Committee on July 15, 2014. The committee reported her nomination favorably on July 29, 2014. On September 16, 2014, the U.S. Senate confirmed Hartley by voice vote to be the U.S. ambassador to both France and Monaco. She took her oath of office on October 15, 2014, from Vice President Joe Biden.

On January 11, 2015, Hartley represented the United States at a unity march in Paris following the Charlie Hebdo shooting. Later that same year, she proposed that Jeff Koons create an artwork to be offered to the City of Paris in homage to the victims of the 2015 terrorist attacks. The resultant 35-ton work, sited in a very wealthy area near the Champs-Élysées and not the poorer 11th arrondissement around the Bataclan theater murders, Bouquet of Tulips, has raised objections in the French art world that it is inappropriate, as has the singlehanded nature of Koons' selection.

=== Ambassador to the United Kingdom ===
In July 2021, President Joe Biden selected Hartley to become the U.S. Ambassador to the United Kingdom. He officially announced her nomination on January 19, 2022. Hearings on her nomination were held before the Senate Foreign Relations Committee on May 4, 2022. The committee favorably reported her nomination to the Senate floor on May 18, 2022. The Senate confirmed her to the post by voice vote on May 25, 2022. She was sworn in as the ambassador on May 27, 2022. She presented her credentials to Queen Elizabeth II on July 19, 2022, via video link.

Hartley accompanied Joe and Jill Biden as they visited Westminster Hall on September 18, 2022, to pay their respects to the late Elizabeth II as her coffin lay in state. She was also photographed with Obama when he visited Rishi Sunak at 10 Downing Street in March 2024.

== Personal life ==
Hartley is married to investment banker and former Evercore Partners CEO Ralph Schlosstein. They have two children. She has been a member of the Council on Foreign Relations for more than 10 years.

== See also ==
- Ambassadors of the United States

Diplomatic posts
Preceded by Charles Rivkin	United States Ambassador to France; 2014–2017	Succeeded by Jamie McCourt
Preceded by Charles Rivkin	United States Ambassador to Monaco; 2014–2017	Succeeded by Jamie McCourt
Preceded by Woody Johnson	United States Ambassador to the United Kingdom; 2022–2025	Succeeded by Warren Stephens
