= Asher Kushnir =

- Ашер Кушнір
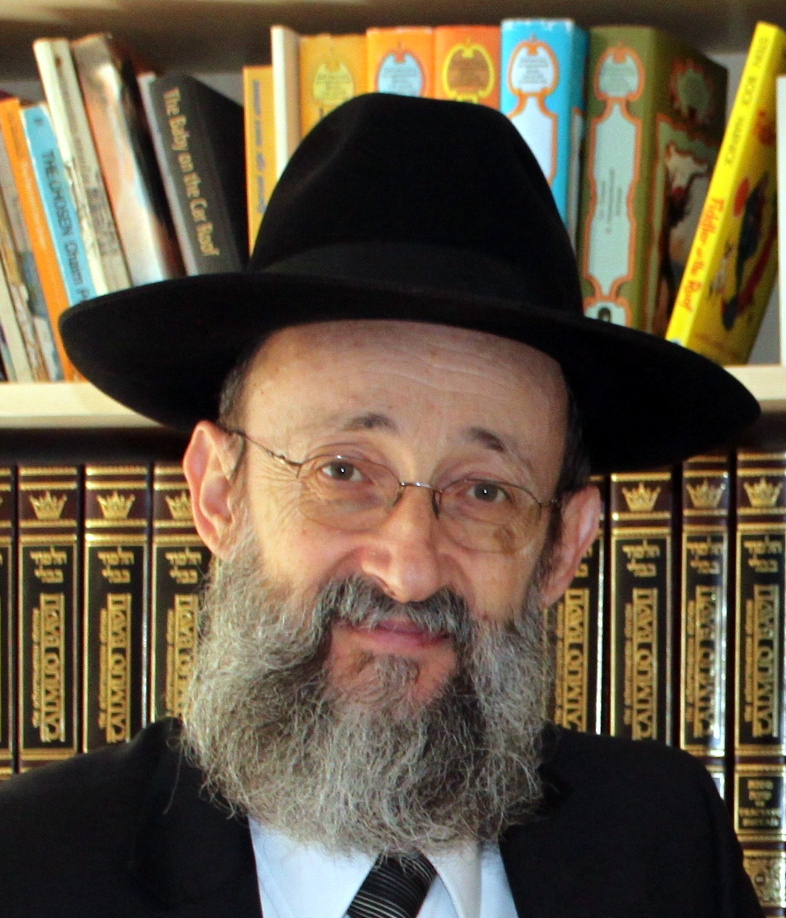
- Born: Chernivtsi, Ukraine
- Other names: Russian: Ашер Кушнир
- Known for: Rabbi, lecturer in childrearing and family relationships

Asher Kushnir (Ukrainian: Ашер Кушнір; Russian: Ашер Кушнир) is a Russian-speaking rabbi, lecturer and specialist on child-rearing and family relationships. He arrived in Israel in 1983 from the former Soviet Union (Ukraine), physicist by profession. After working as a scientist in the Weizmann Institute and serving in the Israeli army, he studied at Ohr Somayach and Mir yeshivas, as well as with Rav Ben Porat.

Rav Asher Kushir is the author of many Russian-language audio lectures, regular seminars, video conferences, radio and TV programs, and books. Rav Asher Kushnir lives in the Bayit VeGan neighborhood of Jerusalem, but speaks in various cities in Israel as well as Germany, USA, Austria, Russia, Ukraine and others.

Rav Asher Kushnir is a co-founder and leader of the Israeli organization for Russian-speaking Jews Toldos Yeshurun, and together with Rav Ben Tzion Zilber directs the largest Russian-language portal on Judaism, "Judaism and Russian Jews".
