= Transmediality =

Transmediality is a term used in intermediality studies, narratology, and new media studies (in particular in the phrase ‘transmedia storytelling’ derived from Henry Jenkins), to describe phenomena which are non-media specific, meaning not connected to a specific medium, and can therefore be realized in a large number of different media, such as literature, art, film, or music. The medium from which a given phenomenon originated is either irrelevant or impossible to determine; it is not an adaptation of a phenomenon from one medium to another.

== History of the term ==
The term transmediality was first used in this sense by Irina O. Rajewsky in her publication Intermedialität (2002) and defined as "medienunspezifische Phänomene, die in verschiedenen Medien mit den dem jeweiligen Medium eigenen Mitteln ausgetragen werden können, ohne dass hierbei die Annahme eines kontaktgebenden Ursprungsmediums wichtig oder möglich ist." In her theory, the concept of transmediality is differentiated from the two opposing concepts of intramediality and intermediality. She defines intramediality as the quality of phenomena which occur only within one medium, while intermediality describes the quality of phenomena which can move in between two or more media, that is, which transgress media boundaries. The important distinction between intermedial and transmedial phenomena is that an intermedial phenomenon has a clear origin medium, while a transmedial phenomenon does not, it is non-media specific.

Werner Wolf adopted Rajewsky’s term transmediality in his intermediality theory and defined it similarly, saying that transmediality “concerns phenomena that appear in more than one medium without being (viewed as) specific to, or having an origin in, any of them." The difference is that in his approach, transmediality is defined as a subcategory of intermediality, next to intermedial transposition (e.g. film adaptation of a novel), intermedial reference (e.g. imitating film in a novel) and plurimediality (e.g. graphic novels). It is therefore not a separate and opposing concept, but a kind of extracompositional intermediality, that is, relations between media that involve more than one work or composition.

== Examples ==
The quality of transmediality applies to a great variety of different phenomena. Transmedial phenomena can occur on the content level, for instance in the form of myths or legends that have become part of a culture and lost their connection to any specific medium. They can also be formal devices that are present in various media, or characteristic aesthetics and traits of a given historical period.

=== Vampires ===
The vampire is a mythical creature that frequently appears in many different media nowadays, such as literature (e.g. Interview With the Vampire), film (e.g. Dark Shadows), TV series (e.g. Buffy the Vampire Slayer), or comic books (e.g. American Vampire). The vampires in these stories are not adapted from one story in a specific medium; the vampire myth has become common cultural knowledge. Although the vampire myth can be traced back to south-eastern European legends, and Bram Stoker’s Dracula has greatly influenced the modern idea of the vampire, the vampire myth is not connected to or adapted from one specific source medium anymore and can therefore be considered transmedial.

=== Narrativity ===
A basic formal device and mode of representation which is clearly transmedial is narrativity. Humans permanently use narratives to express themselves, and therefore, narratives can not only be found in obviously narrative media such as literature or film, but also, to a certain extent, in paintings or even music.

=== Characteristic traits of eighteenth-century sensibility ===
The culture of sensibility had a great impact on Western Europe in the eighteenth century, and its characteristic traits, most importantly the celebration and expression of emotions such as love, care, and pity, can be seen in different kinds of media and are not connected to any specific medium. Some examples are fiction (e.g. Pamela, or Virtue Rewarded by Samuel Richardson), drama (e.g. The Conscious Lovers by Richard Steele), painting (e.g. Le Fils Ingrat by Jean-Baptiste Greuze) or music (e.g. Carl Philipp Emanuel Bach).

== Other uses of the term ==
In narratology and new media studies, the term transmediality is frequently used to refer to the concept of transmedia storytelling, which was coined by Henry Jenkins in 2006. Transmedia storytelling is the technique of unfolding a story across multiple media platforms, “with each new text making a distinctive and valuable contribution to the whole.” This is often done, for instance, by extending the story of a film in a computer game or TV series.

Less frequently, the term transmediality is also simply defined as ”the state of being represented in multiple media.” By this definition, any content which occurs in more than one medium is transmedial, which includes adaptations.

For some scholars, the term expresses the process of the transfer of content from an origin medium to a target medium, the transition from one media specific expression to another.
