= Navahrudak Ghetto =

Nazi ghetto in occupied Belarus

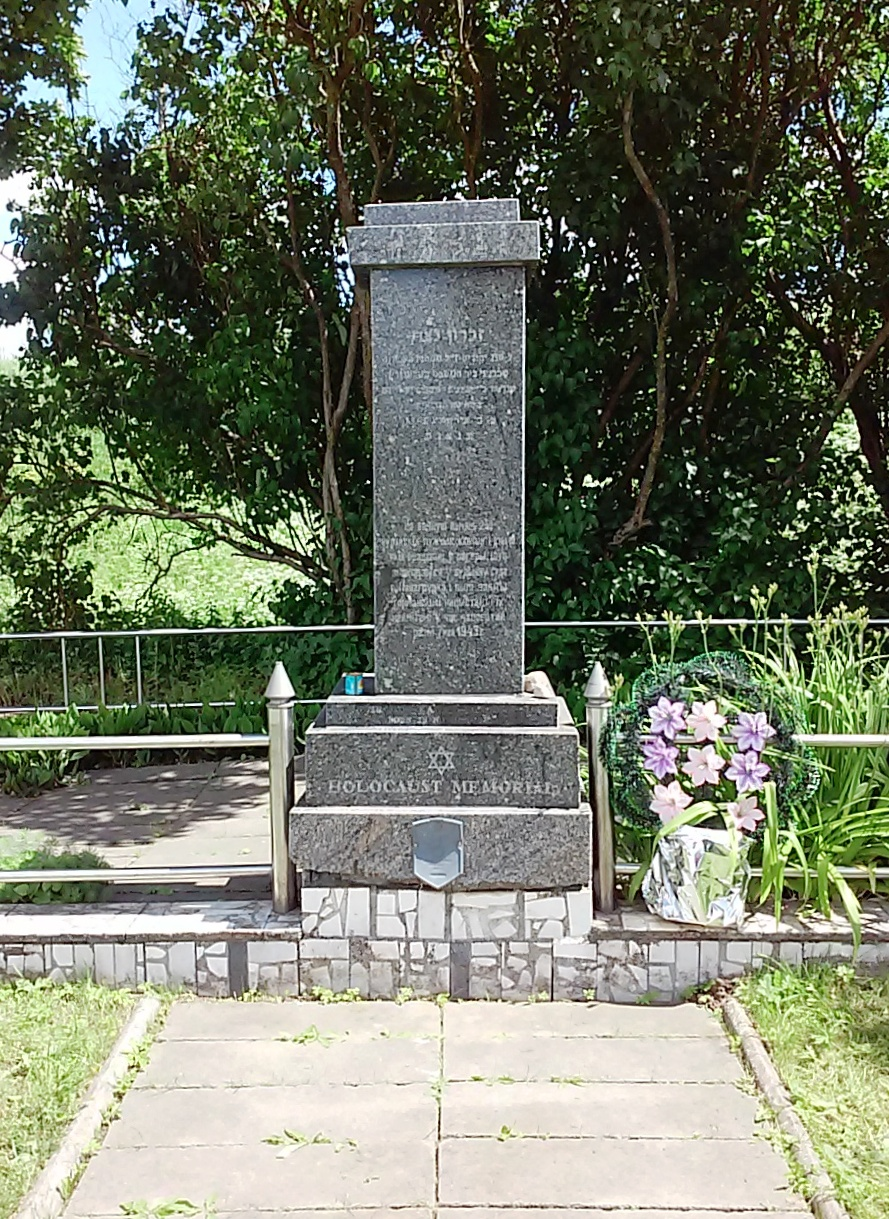
- Monument at Minsk Street to the victims of the Navahrudak Ghetto
- Location: Navahrudak, Reichskommissariat Ostland; 53°35′N 25°49′E
- Date: December 1941–late 1943
- Incident type: Imprisonment, mass shootings, forced labour
- Participants: Wehrmacht; 36th Estonian Police Battalion; Lithuanian Auxiliary Police Battalions
- Victims: 10,000

The Navahrudak Ghetto was established in December 1941 in Navahrudak, in the Byelorussian SSR (present-day Belarus), during the Holocaust. Almost all of its residents were killed - only 350 survived, and 10,000 perished.

== Establishment ==
Prior to the outbreak of World War II, roughly 6,000 Jews lived in the city of Navahrudak, in what was then the Second Polish Republic. Following the beginning of Operation Barbarossa on 22 June 1941, the city was occupied by Nazi Germany on 4 July. Immediately following the occupation's beginning, Jews were required to wear sewn Stars of David as identification.

Immediately after the occupation's beginning, 100 Jews were taken into the street, where they were lined up and every other individual was executed. On 14 July 1941, 52 Jews were taken from the market square and executed in the city's Jewish cemetery.

On 6 December 1941, the Jewish population of Navahrudak was ordered to assemble within the city's courthouse, where they were locked up overnight. The following morning, 500 Jews were taken from the courthouse to the nearby village of Skrydlevo, where they were subsequently executed.

The surviving population was segregated that month into two separate ghettos of the city; one on Minsk Street and the other on Peresets Street, each surrounded by a wooden fence and barbed wire. The population of these ghettos then performed forced labour. Over 8,000 Jews from the surrounding region were forced into the Peresets Street ghetto.

== Liquidation ==
The work of exterminating the ghetto's population began immediately; on 8 December 1941 alone, 2,990 Jews were killed. Actions involving the massacres of Jews, as well, was not limited to the Wehrmacht: on 7 August 1942, the 36th Estonian Police Battalion also participated in killings, and the 11th Lithuanian Auxiliary Police Battalion killed 3,000 of the ghetto's residents on 8 December 1941.

On 7 May 1943, 300 people, mostly women and children, were shot to death. In July 1942, the Peresets Street ghetto was liquidated, and in autumn of 1943, the Minsk Street ghetto met the same fate. From the Navahrudak Ghetto's establishment in December 1941 until the ultimate destruction of the Minsk Street ghetto, a total of 10,000 Jews were killed. No more than 350 residents survived.

== Resistance and Righteous Among the Nations ==
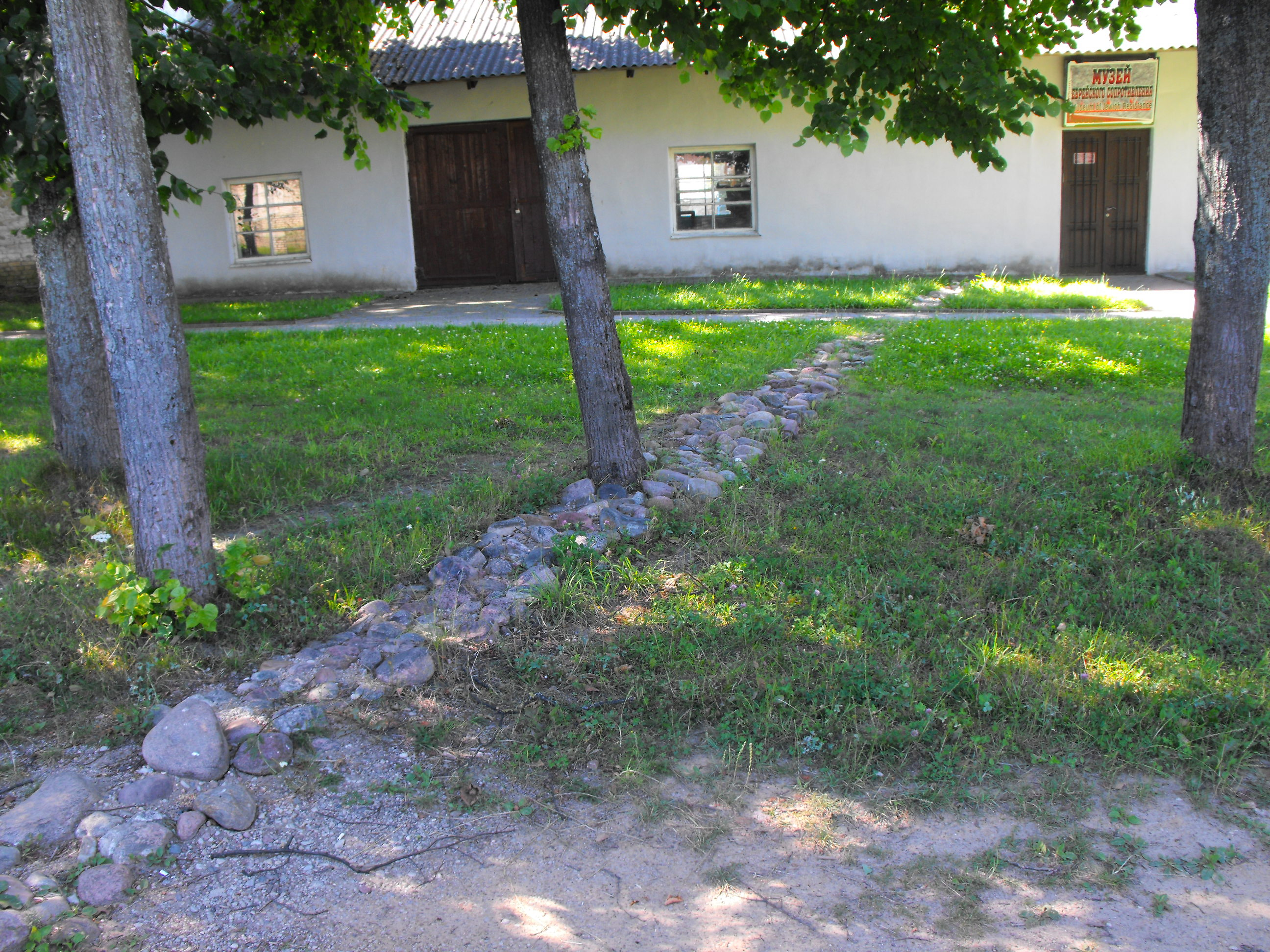
A section of the tunnel by which the ghetto's residents escaped, marked with stones.

Escapes from the Navahrudak Ghetto began in April 1942. In mid-May 1943, the ghetto's remaining residents, led by Reichel Kushner (grandmother of Jared Kushner), began to dig a tunnel out of the ghetto, which would eventually grow to more than 250 metres long. Five months after work began, 232 people escaped through the tunnel starting on 26 September 1943. Of the 232 that escaped through the tunnel, over 100 joined the Bielski partisans, while others joined other detachments. According to the Belarusian Telegraph Agency, the escape was the largest in Europe.

13 residents of Navahrudak were granted the title of Righteous Among the Nations by Yad Vashem, the official Holocaust memorial centre of Israel. Among them were Kanstancin Kazloŭski, who, along with his sons Hienadz and Uladzimir, rescued 500 Jews, including 7 residents of the Navahrudak Ghetto, and Barbara Tarnecka, who saved two residents of the ghetto.

== Legacy ==
No complete list of the Navahrudak Ghetto's victims has been published, but incomplete ones have been created. The building which formerly contained the entrance to the tunnel now contains the Museum of Jewish Resistance in Navahrudak, and monuments were erected at three sites of massacres (Minsk Street, two kilometres from the city limits, and near Skrydlevo) by survivor Jack Kagan in 1993 and 1995. In 2017, a monument to 12-year-old victim Mikhle Sosnovsky, who was shot to death by German police, was placed in the city.
