= Kushner Studios =

Kushner Studios, is a New York City-based architectural firm known for its residential, commercial, and hospitality projects. Founded by Adam Kushner in 1994, the firm embraces traditionally independent disciplines of construction, development, and their related endeavors within a shared space, all overseen in some capacity by Mr. Kushner & his partners.

== Adam Kushner ==
Adam Kushner was born in New York City and subsequently moved to suburban Long Island where he graduated from Plainview-Old Bethpage John F. Kennedy High School. He then obtained his BA in architecture in 1986 at Rensselaer Polytechnic Institute, his MArch in architecture in 1994 at Cornell University, and founded Kushner Studios in 1994. Kushner has taught at Pratt Institute in the Graduate School of Architecture, as an adjunct professor at NJIT and NYIT, Rutgers University, and as a design studio instructor at Cornell University.

== In House Group, affiliated contracting venture ==
Kushner Studio’s practice includes the related fields of construction and hands-on fabrication for many of the projects it designs, through its related general contracting firm, In House Group, Inc. This follows a relatively new trend in which architects become involved in the development of the projects that they have designed.

== Notable projects ==
Kushner Studios designed the Baxter Street Condominiums, which included the first Automated parking system in New York City and second in the United States. The firm has designed an apartment unit located on Barrow Street incorporating reclaimed New York City subway car doors and see through glass floors, as well as other custom apartment renovations. The purchase of this townhome was chronicled in season two of Bravo’s “Million Dollar Listing New York”. Additionally, the firm specializes in restaurant design and construction, having designed New York City eateries including Meet, En Brasserie, M.Wells Steakhouse, Penolopes, Times Square Café, Kings County Distillery, Kings County Brewing Collective, Grimm Artisan Ales, Evil Twin Brewing, and Five Boroughs Brewing
