= Yvonne Levy Kushner =

American actress

Yvonne Kushner
- Born: Yvonne Levy; October 12, 1906; New Iberia, Louisiana, U.S.
- Died: February 8, 1990 (aged 83); Washington D.C., U.S.
- Occupations: Socialite, Philanthropist and Actress
- Spouse: Dr. David Howard Kushner

Yvonne Kushner (née Levy; October 12, 1906 – February 8, 1990) was an American actress and socialite in New York and Washington, DC. She became a philanthropist for women's health and Jewish causes.

== Early life ==
Yvonne Levy was born on October 12, 1906, in New Iberia, Louisiana, as the youngest of three children of Leopold and Blanche (née Coguenhem) Levy. Her father was originally from Alsace and emigrated to the United States in 1879. He worked in New Orleans as a merchant and in real estate. He was born in Wingersheim, Alsace, in 1864, when it was part of France, along the disputed border regions between Germany and France. Her mother was a native of Louisiana, the daughter of a French-Jewish father, whose family originally came from Lorraine, and an American mother. Yvonne had an older brother Oscar Isaac and older sister Denise.

In 1916, Leopold Levy took over the lease for the failed Louisiana State Bank in New Orleans and renamed the building as The Antique Dome, selling old furniture and antiques. Six years later, he moved his family to Washington, D. C. Yvonne and her sister both attended Central High School, where Yvonne was captain of the debating team and performed in school plays.

Yvonne's brother, Oscar Isaac Levy (1892–1957), attended Tulane University as a science major and later the University of Chicago. By the time of World War I, he worked as an assistant examiner with the United States Patent Office in New Orleans.

Their sister, Denise Levy Tourover (1903–1980), became an attorney and married in Washington, DC. She served as Hadassah’s first representative in the city. During World War II, she lobbied relentlessly to save hundreds of Polish orphans, known as the "Tehran Children", who were stranded in Iran after fleeing Nazi-occupied Europe. Her efforts bore fruit when the Allies dispatched British war ships to transport the children to the relative safety of British Palestine.

== Career ==
Not long after her high school graduation, Yvonne Levy became an actress in New York City.

In the late 1920s, she married David Howard Kushner (1904–1994), a doctor and native of Washington D.C., and returned to that city. She became a regular performer at the City Theatre. In later years she would act in and direct dramatic productions put on at the Adas Israel Congregation.

Levy Kushner was also an active fund raiser for the Columbia Hospital for Women and a member of Hadassah, B'nai B'rith and Youth Aliyah.

== Marriage and family ==
Yvonne Levy was married for 61 years to Dr. David Howard Kushner (1904–1994), an alumnus of Central High School and Georgetown University. Kushner was a gynecologist-obstetrician and infertility specialist. He founded the International Fertility Society and served as chief of staff at Columbia Hospital for Women.

The couple had three daughters: Judith, Jane and Delia. Judith Kushner died in 1952, at age eighteen from a rare blood disorder. Jane Kushner became a Drama Teacher and her daughter Lesley Schisgall Currier co-founded Marin Shakespeare Company.

== Death ==
Yvonne Levy Kushner died from pneumonia on February 8, 1990, aged 83, at George Washington University Hospital in Washington D.C.; she was survived by her husband, two daughters and extended family.
