= Joseph Kushner Hebrew Academy =

Modern Orthodox Private Yeshiva in New Jersey

Coordinates: 40.7736°N 74.3602°W

The Joseph Kushner Hebrew Academy is a coeducational Modern Orthodox Yeshiva Day School located in Livingston, New Jersey. The Academy is dedicated to developmental education and religious growth, for both boys and girls from Pre-Kindergarten through Grade 8. The affiliated Rae Kushner Yeshiva High School serves students in grades nine through 12.

As of the 2023–24 school year, the school had an enrollment of 690 students (plus 42 in PreK) and 133.8 classroom teachers (on an FTE basis), for a student–teacher ratio of 5.2:1.

== History ==
The school was the successor to The Hebrew Youth Academy, last in West Caldwell, NJ, before moving to Livingston & being sponsored by Charles Kushner, named in honor of his father Joseph Kushner.

The Hebrew Academy was founded in Newark, NJ in approximately 1941 with a building on Clinton Avenue. It merged with the Hebrew Youth Institute in 1960-61 school year, becoming the Hebrew Youth Academy & moving into the Young Israel of Newark, building on Lyons Avenue. When that building sold, it moved to Hillside, South Orange (with Rabbi Segal of the Young Israel) & from there to West Caldwell. Principals included Rabbi Rennert, Rabbi Lieman, Rabbi Shuchatowitz, Rabbi Carlin, Rabbi Witkind, & Rabbi Green. Longtime teachers included Rabbi Zakheim, Rabbi Steinberg, Rebbetzin Genauer, Mrs. Manson, Mrs. Raushbach, Rabbi Edrei, Mrs. Glassman, Mrs. Sklar, & Mrs. Kern.

In 2020, the Joseph Kushner Hebrew Academy was the recipient of $1–2 million dollars in Paycheck Protection Program loans from the US Small Business Administration.
