= Rae Kushner Yeshiva High School =

Private high school in Essex County, New Jersey, United States

Location
- 110 South Orange Avenue; Livingston, Essex County 07039; United States
- 40.7736°N 74.3602°W

Information
- Type: Private Yeshiva High School
- Motto: "Inspiring Excellence"
- Headmaster: Rabbi Eliezer Rubin
- Grades: 9-12
- Age range: 13–18
- Language: English and Hebrew
- Hours in school day: 9 hours Monday-Thursday, 5 1/2 Friday
- Campus: Suburban
- Colors: Light Blue, Navy, Royal Blue, White and Orange
- Athletics conference: MYHSAL
- Nickname: RKYHS
- Team name: Kushner Cobras
- Accreditation: New Jersey Association of Independent Schools
- Newspaper: The Voice
- School fees: $1,500
- Tuition: $100,000 (2017-18)
- Communities served: Livingston, West Orange, East Brunswick, Highland Park, Edison, Staten Island, Elizabeth, Hillside, Springfield, Lakewood
- Feeder schools: JKHA, RPRY, JFS, JEC
- Affiliation: Modern Orthodox Judaism, Zionism
- Website: www.jkha.org

Rae Kushner Yeshiva High School / Yeshivat HaTichonit Beit Yosef is a four-year private Modern Orthodox yeshiva high school located in Livingston, New Jersey, United States. The school serves students living in areas ranging from Livingston, West Orange, East Brunswick, Highland Park/Edison, Staten Island, Elizabeth and Union County. The affiliated Joseph Kushner Hebrew Academy serves students through eighth grade. As of the 2013–14 school year, the school had an enrollment of 236 students.

== History ==
The earliest predecessor to the Joseph Kushner Hebrew Academy was founded in 1942. In a merger with four Talmud Torahs in 1948, the school started its evolution into a Jewish day school. From the original seven students, the school grew to approximately 400 students in its building on Clinton Avenue, Newark. In 1987, the school became the Joseph Kushner Hebrew Academy and moved to Livingston in 1996.

The Kushner Yeshiva High School opened its doors in 2000 with 57 freshman students, a comparatively large enrollment for a new Yeshiva High School. Kushner Yeshiva High School was renamed to the Rae Kushner Yeshiva High School, in memory of the wife of Joseph Kushner, by their son Charles Kushner, one of the school's primary benefactors.

The school is situated on a 30-acre (120,000 m^{2}) campus that features a 225,000-square-foot (20,900 m^{2}) building includes a 20,000-volume English-Judaic library, a 220-seat Beit Midrash, a 600-seat auditorium, Holocaust Memorial Gardens, Holocaust studies center, hockey rink, and a multipurpose gymnasium.

The school houses a program of the SINAI Special Needs Institute, also known as SINAI Schools, an organization dedicated to serving the educational, psychological and emotional needs of children with special needs or complex learning disabilities. Children of below to above average intelligence with different degrees of learning disability, with a wide variety of behavioral characteristics are served, whose needs could not be addressed by traditional Jewish day school programs and curricula.

== Administration ==
Core members of the school's administration are

- Rabbi Eliezer Rubin - Head of School, Klatt Family Rosh Hayeshiva
- Rabbi Maccabee Avishur - Principal
- Howard Plotsker - Associate Principal
- Gary Berger - Assistant Principal, Guidance and Student Services
- Jeremy Halpern and Dov Lando - co-presidents
