= Boris Kushner =

Boris Kushner may refer to:

- Boris Kushner (poet) (1888–1937), Russian poet art critic and political activist
- Boris Kushner (mathematician) (1941–2019), Russian poet and mathematician
