= List of ambassadors of the United States to Monaco =

Ambassador of the United States to Monaco
- Seal of the United States Department of State

- Flag of a United States ambassador

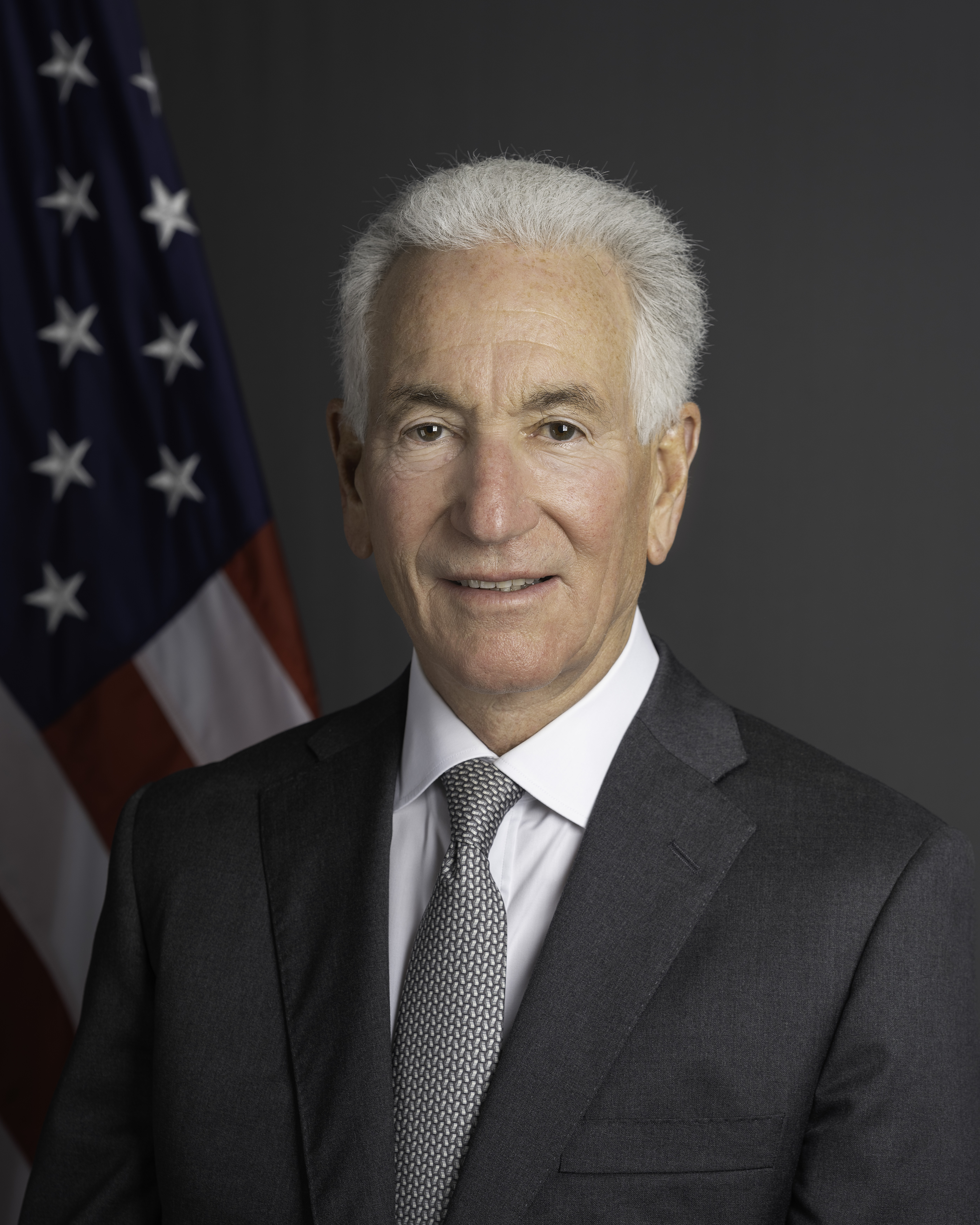
- Incumbent; Charles Kushner since October 27, 2025
- Nominator: The president of the United States
- Appointer: The president; with Senate advice and consent
- Inaugural holder: Craig Roberts Stapleton; Ambassador to France accredited to Monaco
- Formation: December 2006
- Website: U.S. Embassy – Paris

The United States interests in Monaco are represented from the U.S. Embassy in Paris and U.S. Consulate General in Marseille, France. Full diplomatic relations between Monaco and the United States were established in December 2006 and the ambassador Craig Roberts Stapleton to France was accredited to Monaco. The Consulate General in Marseille handles most of working-level contacts with Monaco.

President Joe Biden nominated former U.S. ambassador to Belgium and Women for Biden executive director Denise Campbell Bauer for the position on June 9, 2021. She was sworn in on December 23, 2021. Bauer, presented her credentials to Prince Albert II on September 29, 2022.

== U.S. ambassadors accredited to Monaco ==
- Craig Roberts Stapleton (2006–2009)
- Charles Rivkin (2009–2013)
- Jane D. Hartley (2014–2017)
- Jamie McCourt (2017–2021)
- Denise Bauer (2022–2025)
- Charles Kushner (2025-present)

== See also ==
- Monaco–United States relations
- Foreign relations of Monaco
- Ambassadors of the United States
- Maguy Maccario Doyle - Monaco Ambassador to the United States
