= Charles Kushner =

American real-estate developer and diplomat (born 1954)

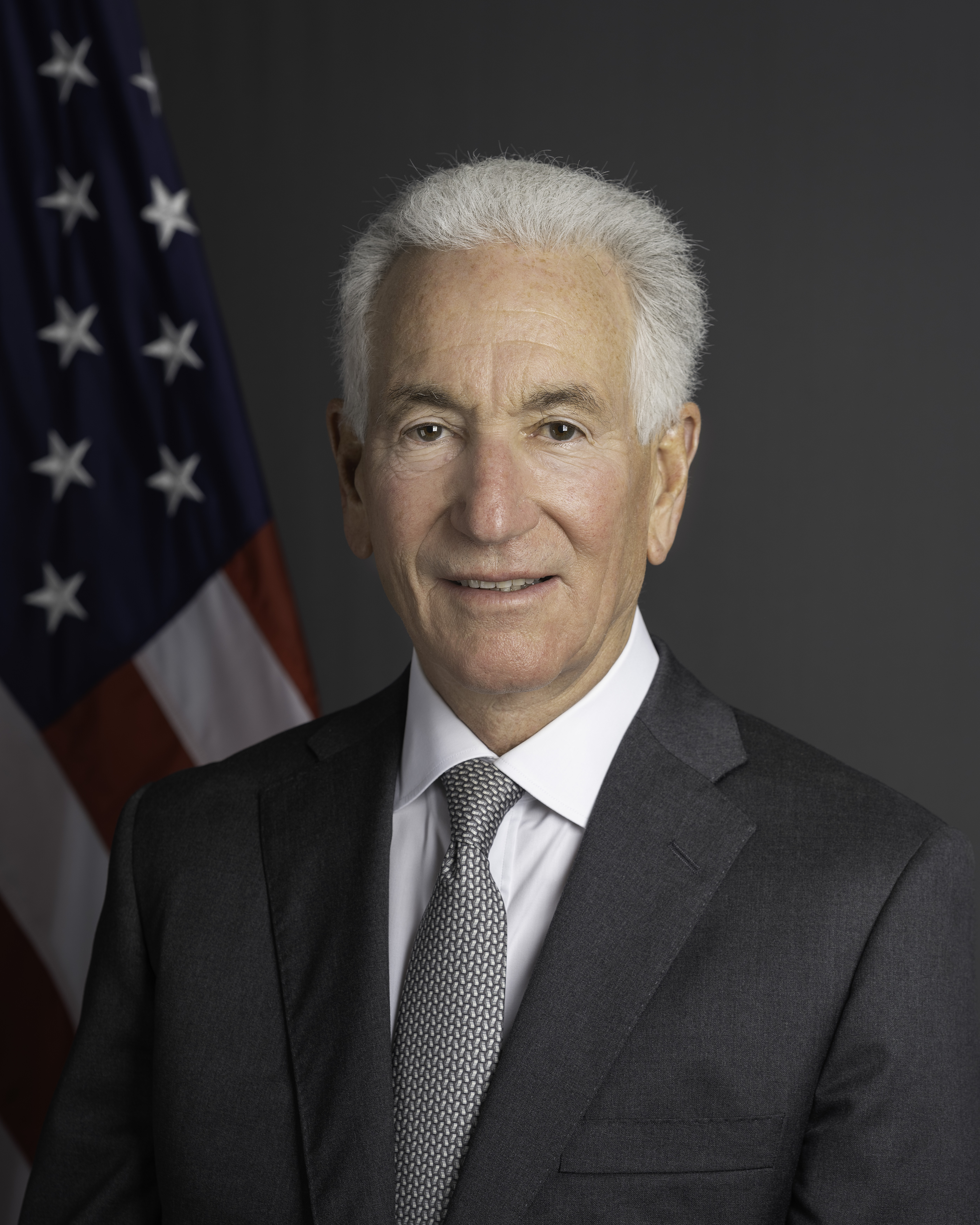
- Official portrait, 2025

United States Ambassador to France and Monaco
- Incumbent
- Assumed office July 11, 2025
- President: Donald Trump
- Preceded by: Denise Bauer

Personal details
- Born: Chanan Kushner; May 16, 1954 (age 72)
- Spouse: Seryl Stadtmauer
- Children: 4, including Jared and Joshua
- Relatives: Joseph Kushner (father); Kushner family
- Education: New York University (BA, MBA); Hofstra University (JD)

Charles Kushner (born May 16, 1954) is an American real estate developer, diplomat, and former attorney serving since 2025 as the United States ambassador to France and Monaco. He founded Kushner Companies in 1985.

Charles' elder son, Jared is the husband of Ivanka Trump, during whose father's first presidential administration he served as a Senior Adviser from 2017 to 2021. He has three other children, including his younger son Joshua, a venture capitalist who is married to the supermodel Karlie Kloss.

In 2005, Kushner was convicted of illegal campaign contributions, tax evasion, and witness tampering, and was sentenced to two years' imprisonment, which he served in the Federal Prison Camp, Montgomery. As a convicted felon, he was also disbarred in three states. He later received a pardon issued by his son's father-in-law, President Trump, on December 23, 2020. Kushner has donated significant amounts to Trump's campaigns. Previously, he was a major Democratic party donor. In 2025, he was nominated by President Trump to serve as United States ambassador to France during his second administration. He was confirmed by the United States Senate on May 19, 2025, by a vote of 51–45.

== Early life ==
Charles Kushner was born on May 16, 1954 to Joseph Berkowitz and Rae Kushner, Jewish Holocaust survivors born in eastern Poland who went to America from the USSR in 1949. At birth, he was named Chanan, after a maternal uncle who died in a German concentration camp during the Holocaust. He grew up in Elizabeth, New Jersey, with his elder brother Murray Kushner and sister Esther Schulder. His father worked as a construction worker, builder, and real estate investor. Kushner graduated from the Hofstra University School of Law in 1979.

== Career ==
=== Kushner Companies ===
In 1985, Kushner began managing his father's portfolio of 4,000 New Jersey apartments. He founded Kushner Companies – headquartered in Florham Park, New Jersey – and became its chairman. In 1999, he won the Ernst & Young New Jersey Entrepreneur of the Year award. At the time, Kushner Companies had grown to more than 10,000 residential apartments, a homebuilding business, commercial and industrial properties, and a community bank.

=== Criminal conviction and pardon ===
On June 30, 2004, Kushner was fined $508,900 by the Federal Election Commission for contributing to Democratic political campaigns in the names of his partnerships when he lacked authorization to do so. In 2005, following an investigation by United States attorney for the District of New Jersey Chris Christie negotiated a plea agreement with him, under which Kushner pleaded guilty to 18 counts of illegal campaign contributions, tax evasion, and witness tampering. The witness tampering charge arose from Kushner's retaliation against William Schulder, his sister Esther's husband, who was cooperating with federal investigators against Kushner. Kushner hired a prostitute to seduce his brother-in-law, arranging to record a sexual encounter between the two and send the tape to his sister. He was sentenced to two years in prison and served 14 months at Federal Prison Camp, Montgomery, in Alabama before being sent to a halfway house in Newark, New Jersey, to complete his sentence. He was released from prison on August 25, 2006.

As a convicted felon, Charles Kushner was also disbarred and prohibited from practicing law in New Jersey, New York, and Pennsylvania. Republican Chris Christie, who chaired Trump’s first transition team, said Kushner committed "one of the most loathsome, disgusting crimes" he prosecuted.

December 2020 pardon granted by Donald Trump

On December 23, 2020, President Trump issued a full and unconditional pardon to Kushner, his daughter's father-in-law, citing his record of "reform" and "charity".

=== New York City real estate ===
After being released from prison, Kushner shifted his business activities from New Jersey to New York City. In early 2007, Kushner Companies bought the 666 Fifth Avenue building in Manhattan for $1.8 billion. In August 2018, Brookfield Properties signed a 99-year lease for the property, paying $1.286 billion and effectively taking full ownership of the building.

As of the end of 2016, Kushner and his family were estimated to have a net worth of $1.8 billion. He has employed two fellow inmates with whom he became acquainted in prison.

=== Donations ===
Kushner met personally with Harvard University's president Neil Rudenstine and in 1998 donated $2.5 million to Harvard. His son, Jared, was then beginning his senior year of high school, where he was not a particularly good student with test scores below Ivy League standards. Jared was admitted to the Harvard freshman class of 1999.

Before 2016, Kushner was a donor to the Democratic Party. He is on the boards of Touro College, Stern College for Women, Rabbinical College of America, and the United Jewish Communities. Kushner has made other donations to Harvard, Stern College, and United Cerebral Palsy. He donated to the Seryl and Charles Kushner Maternity Unit at St. Barnabas Medical Center in Livingston, New Jersey. He contributed to the funding of two schools, Joseph Kushner Hebrew Academy and Rae Kushner Yeshiva High School, also in Livingston, and named them after his parents. Kushner Hall is a building that is named after him on the Hofstra University campus. The campus of Jerusalem's Shaare Zedek Medical Center is named the "Seryl and Charles Kushner Campus" in honor of their donation of $20 million.

In August 2015, Kushner donated $100,000 to Donald Trump's Make America Great Again PAC, a super PAC supporting Trump's 2016 campaign for the presidency. Kushner and his wife also hosted a reception for Trump at their Jersey Shore seaside mansion in Long Branch. In 2023, he was one of the largest donors to a Trump super PAC, donating $1 million.

=== U.S. ambassador to France and Monaco ===
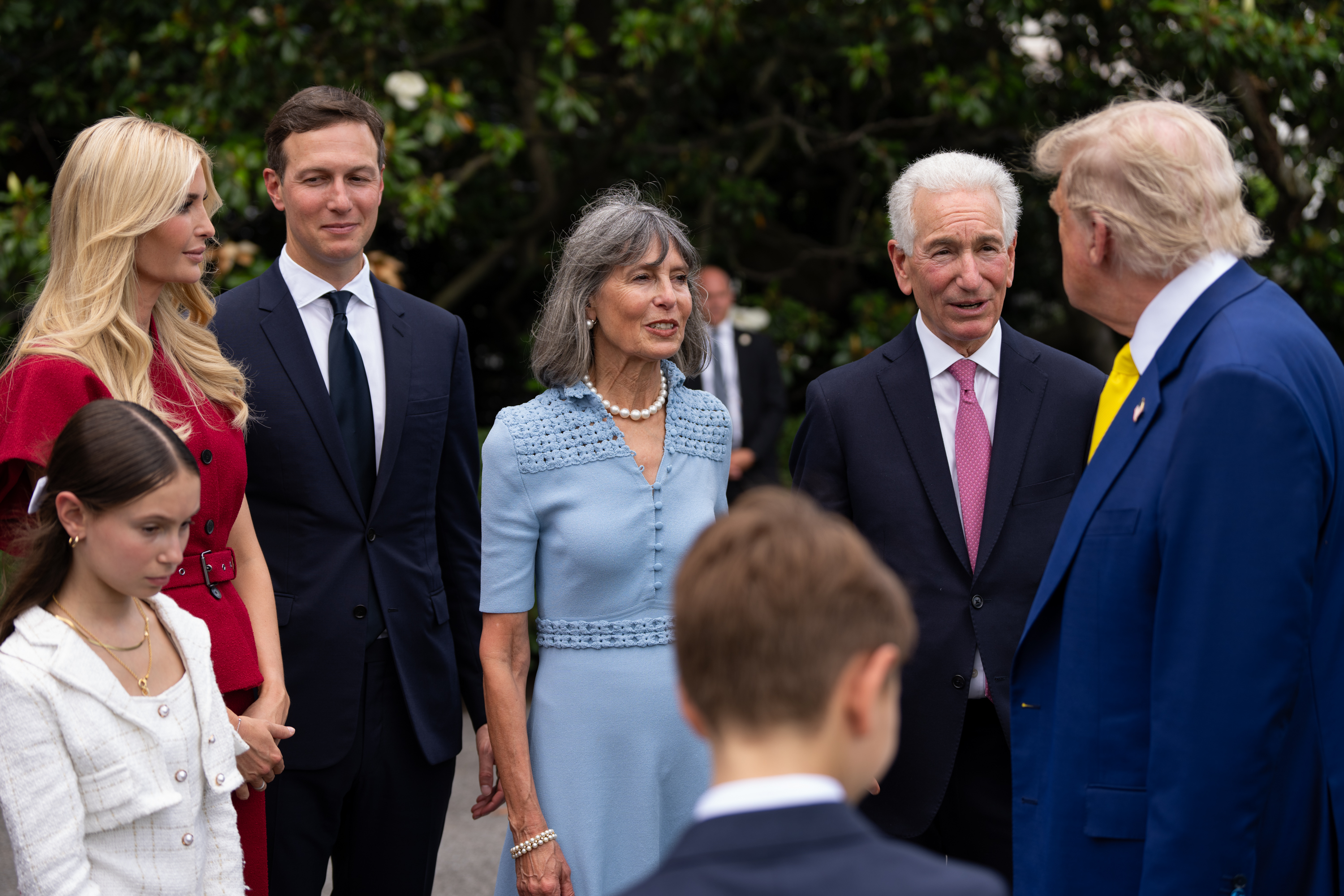
Kushner with his family and President Donald Trump at the White House in June 2025

On November 30, 2024, President-elect Donald Trump announced his intention to nominate Kushner to serve as the United States ambassador to France and Monaco in his second administration. On February 12, 2025, Kushner's nomination was sent to the Senate. His nomination was confirmed by the U.S. Senate by a vote of 51-45. Cory Booker was the one Democratic senator to support his confirmation. Kushner was sworn in on July 11, 2025.

Charles Kushner presented his credentials to Albert II, Prince of Monaco on October 27, 2025.

==== Failure to attend summons and access restrictions ====
In August 2025, France summoned Kushner after he published an open letter to President Macron in The Wall Street Journal alleging insufficient action against rising antisemitic violence, linking attacks on Jews to France’s recognition of a Palestinian state. The French foreign ministry rejected the allegations as "unacceptable", citing the 1961 Vienna Convention’s ban on ambassadorial interference in internal affairs. Kushner did not attend, and the charge d'affaires attended in his place. The French foreign trade minister, Laurent Saint-Martin, remarked that France "need take no lessons whatsoever" from the US on antisemitism.

In February 2026, French authorities restricted Kushner’s direct access to government ministers after he failed to attend a summons from Foreign Minister Jean-Noël Barrot, sending a senior embassy official in his place. The French foreign ministry cited an "apparent failure to grasp the basic requirements of the ambassadorial mission". The summons followed US embassy social media posts stating that "violent radical leftism was on the rise" in connection with the killing of far-right activist Quentin Deranque in Lyon, alleging it posed a public safety threat. A French ministry official later reported that Kushner called Barrot, who reiterated the reason for the summons, after which Kushner expressed his willingness not to interfere in French domestic affairs.

== See also ==
- Kushner family

Diplomatic posts
Preceded by Denise Bauer	United States Ambassador to France; 2025–present	Incumbent
Preceded by Denise Bauer	United States Ambassador to Monaco; 2025–present	Incumbent
