= Motley Rice =

American plaintiffs' litigation firm

Motley Rice LLC
- Headquarters: Mount Pleasant, South Carolina, U.S.
- No. of offices: 9
- No. of attorneys: 136
- No. of employees: 350
- Key people: Joseph F. Rice; Mary Schiavo; Linda Singer
- Date founded: 2003
- Founder: Ron Motley and Joseph F. Rice
- Company type: Limited liability company
- Website: http://www.motleyrice.com/

Motley Rice LLC is an American plaintiffs' litigation firm headquartered in Mount Pleasant, South Carolina.

== History ==
Motley Rice was formed in 2003 by Ron Motley and Joseph F. Rice after the breakup of the law firm Ness, Motley, Loadholdt, Richardson & Poole P.A. of Barnwell, South Carolina. Ron Motley served as lead attorney in the tobacco litigation of the mid-1990s, which resulted in the Tobacco Master Settlement Agreement.

Motley Rice represented about 96,000 asbestos plaintiffs up to 2004. The firm later transitioned into offering asbestos defendants pre-packaged bankruptcies. Companies that file with the assistance of Motley Rice generally emerge from bankruptcy after just a few months and in some cases just 30 to 45 days. Insurance companies are generally stuck with the liability for asbestos claims discharged in such bankruptcy proceedings. Investors are often allowed to keep their equity and often become wealthy when stock prices rise after a firm is cleansed of asbestos liability. Claimants that are extremely ill generally receive far less compensation than they would otherwise qualify for. Standard bankruptcies last an average of six years and can cost millions of dollars per month.

== Notable lawyers ==
- Ronald Motley, co-founding member G.G. see 1987 settlement.
- Joseph F. Rice, co-founding member
- Mary Schiavo, former Inspector General of the United States Department of Transportation, author of Flying Blind, Flying Safe
- Linda Singer, former Washington, D.C. Attorney General
- Marlon Kimpson, former South Carolina Senator and current member of the US Advisory Committee for Trade Policy and Negotiations
- John J. McConnell Jr., current Chief Judge of the United States District Court for the District of Rhode Island

== Controversies ==
=== Frivolous suit against ITT ===
In March 2012, Motley Rice was ordered to pay ITT Educational Services almost $400,000 in legal fees for pursuing a "frivolous" lawsuit the judge said was "based on a completely false story." On review, the 7th US Circuit Court of Appeals reversed the order and reinstated the lawsuit against ITT. The Court of Appeals was critical of the lower court's dismissal, writing, "[W]e believe that Leveski's case is yet another instance of a district court dismissing a False Claims Act suit after viewing the allegations at too high a level of generality."

=== Congoleum ===
In the Congoleum bankruptcy Motley Rice refused to answer questions put to it under Rule 2019. Rule 2019, formally called Federal Rule of Bankruptcy Procedure 2019(a), requires that attorneys representing more than one creditor file a statement naming the creditors, the amounts of their claims, an explanation of how the attorney became employed on the case, and the nature and amount of any relevant claims held by the attorney. Rule 2019 is designed to allow judges to identify conflicts of interests. All lawyers representing more than one client in a bankruptcy must file under this rule but many plaintiffs firms fiercely resist doing so. Bankruptcy judge Kathryn C. Ferguson demanded that Motley Rice fully comply with Rule 2019. Her order was upheld on appeal.

=== Ahearn v. Fibreboard ===
Fiberboard was an asbestos supplier near bankruptcy that attempted to negotiate a global settlement of the claims against it. The proposed settlement would have relied almost entirely on insurance claims. Before the settlement Fiberboard had unpaid debts of at least $1 billion and was facing about 50,000 asbestos injury suits. Fiberboard did not have enough cash ready to enter the Georgine settlement but decided to pursue the same type of arrangement on its own. Fiberboard first negotiated an inventory settlement with Motley Rice predecessor Ness, Motley, Loadholt, Richardson & Poole (Ness Motley) covering 20,000 asbestos claims. This arrangement was later extended to 45,000 claims. Shockingly, the terms of the settlement required Ness Motley to recommend the same terms to any future claimants it might represent. A judge then appointed Ness Motley to negotiate on behalf of future claimants.

Fibreboard and Ness Motley soon announced that they had reached a settlement that would cover all future claims. The judge certified the class within a month of appointing Ness Motley. Ness Motley thus simultaneously represented present and future claimants, an obvious conflict of interest. The proposed settlement would have divided up $500 million among at least 50,000 claimants and earn the firm a $167 million fee. Fibreboard's two main insurers were to contribute about $1.5 billion to a bankruptcy trust fund for future claimants with a very small $10 million from the defendant itself. Under this arrangement Fibreboard would have retained $230 to $300 million in value as a going concern. Unlike most other asbestos settlements no effort was made to ascertain the number of future claimants and what their financial needs may be. This settlement was later overturned on appeal.

=== Ozempic and Mounjaro litigation ===
In 2024, Motley Rice became involved in the multidistrict litigation concerning Novo Nordisk’s Ozempic and Eli Lilly’s Mounjaro, in which plaintiffs allege that the GLP-1 receptor agonist drugs caused severe gastrointestinal injuries, including gastroparesis and intestinal obstruction, and that the manufacturers failed to provide adequate warnings. Following the consolidation of federal lawsuits in the Eastern District of Pennsylvania, a Motley Rice attorney was appointed to the plaintiffs’ leadership structure, assisting in coordinating discovery and litigation strategy in the MDL proceedings.

=== State attorneys general terminate opioid litigation contracts ===
On October 16, 2025, Utah Attorney General Derek Brown terminated the state's contract with Motley Rice to conduct the state's opioid litigation. The firing came after a recent challenge in Utah federal court to have Motley Rice disqualified. Brought by pharmacy benefit manager OptumRx, the motion argued that Motley Rice's simultaneous representation of state and private clients violated ethics rules.

“Motley Rice’s lawyers obtained confidential government information about OptumRx while serving as government lawyers,” the filing stated, and that information “could be used to OptumRx’s material disadvantage in this litigation.”

On October 23, 2025, Alaska followed other states in terminating its opioid litigation contract with Motley Rice claiming conflict of interest and confidentiality violations. In a letter to the firm, Alaska Attorney General Stephen Cox wrote that Motley Rice had failed to disclose its simultaneous representation of clients in other opioid litigation while representing Alaska.

The letter stated that the Attorney General's office had "reason to believe that the firm may have shared confidential information obtained through its representation of the state.”

Several years prior, in 2021, Montana Attorney General Austin Knudsen also terminated its contract with Motley Rice.
