= Columbia Southern University =

American for-profit online university

- Type: Private for-profit online university
- Established: 1993; 33 years ago
- Accreditation: SACSCOC
- President: Ken Styron
- Provost: Janell Gibson
- Students: 18,487 (fall 2023)
- Undergraduates: 13,111 (fall 2023)
- Postgraduates: 5,376 (fall 2023)
- Location: Orange Beach, Alabama, U.S. 30°19′45.26″N 87°39′9.4″W
- Colors: Navy blue & gold
- Nickname: Knights
- Mascot: 'Sir Maximus' the CSU Knight
- Website: www.columbiasouthern.edu

Columbia Southern University is a private for-profit online university based in Orange Beach, Alabama, United States. It was founded in 1993 and is accredited by the Southern Association of Colleges and Schools Commission on Colleges.

== History ==
Columbia Southern University was founded in 1993 by Robert G. Mayes Sr. The university developed its first degree programs in Environmental Engineering and Occupational Safety and Health in 1994. By 1996 additional degree programs were developed and offered: The Bachelor of Science in Business Administration, followed by Computer Science, Criminal Justice Administration, and Health Administration.

Mayes headed the institution until his death in 2005, when his son, Robert Mayes Jr., assumed the presidency. Ken Styron became president on May 1, 2018.

== Academics ==
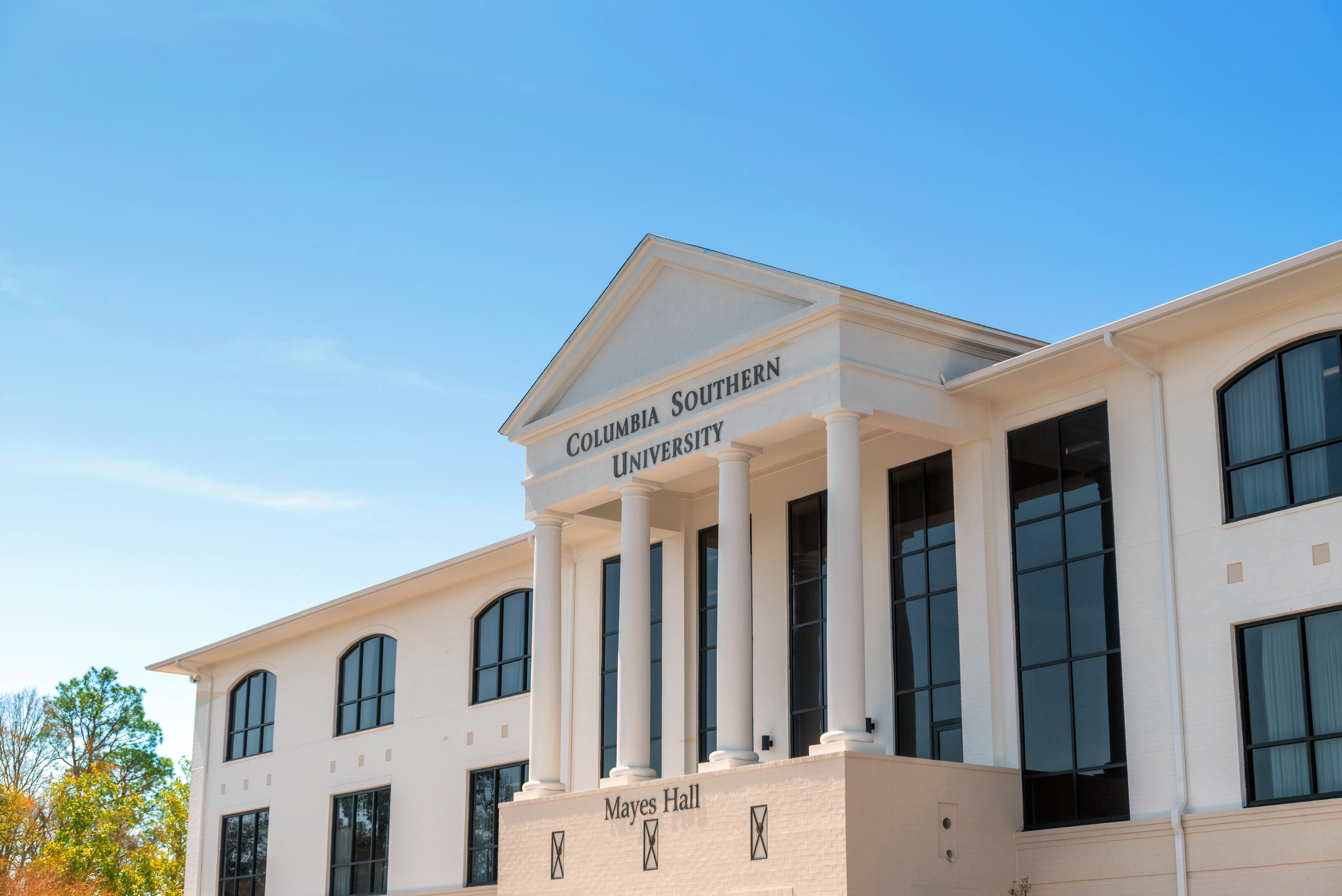
Mayes Hall, named for the founder of the university, is located on the university's campus in Orange Beach, Alabama.

Columbia Southern University consists of six colleges:

- College of Arts and Sciences
- College of Business and Technology
- College of Education
- College of Nursing and Health Sciences
- College of Safety & Emergency Services
- College of Space, Intelligence, and Military Operations

The university offers more than 120 degree programs at the associate, bachelor's, master's, and doctoral levels, as well as 29 certificate programs online.

As an online-focused institution, the school is able to offer flexible, accredited degrees, with particular recognition towards its occupational safety and health, fire science, and nursing programs. The occupational safety and health programs are Qualified Academic Programs (QAP) through the Board of Certified Safety Professionals (BCSP), allowing graduates to apply for the Graduate Safety Practitioner (GSP) designation. The fire science programs are recognized through the Fire and Emergency Services Higher Education (FESHE) network of the National Fire Academy.

Columbia Southern has more than 1,000 full-time faculty and staff. It enrolls and graduates thousands of students annually. The university is one of approximately 140 schools approved to offer tuition assistance through the U.S. Army's centralized tuition assistance portal, GoArmyEd.

=== Student outcomes ===
Columbia Southern's 8-year graduation rate is 48 percent. The typical median earning after graduation from this institution is $80,589. Nearly two-thirds of graduates finish with zero student loans.

=== Rankings ===
Columbia Southern University has consistently ranked among the most affordable, military-friendly, and best online schools in the nation.

== Accreditation and memberships ==
Columbia Southern University received accreditation from the Southern Association of Colleges and Schools Commission on Colleges in 2022 to award associate, baccalaureate, master's, and doctorate degrees, and certificates.

In 2023, the university's business program received accreditation from the Accreditation Council for Business Schools and Programs (ACBSP).

The university's nursing program earned pre-accreditation candidacy from the National League for Nursing Commission for Nursing Education Accreditation (NLN CNEA) in 2025.

The university is a member of the American Council on Education, Alabama Commission on Higher Education, and the National Council for State Authorization Reciprocity Agreements (NC-SARA).

== Notable alumni ==
- Steve Bashore (M.B.A., 2019), American politician
- Chad Bianco (B.S., 2015), American law enforcement officer and politician
- William Bruck (M.B.A., 2014), American politician
- Howard R. Elliott (M.S., 2011), American government official
- Kenneth Gittens (B.S., 2008, M.S., 2011), U.S. Virgin Islands politician
- Rob Harris (A.S., 2019), American politician
- Earl Jaques Jr. (B.S., 1998), American politician
- Brian Lawson (A.S., 2022), American politician and businessman
- Mike Loychik (B.A.Sc.), American politician
- Steven Nordhaus (M.S. 2013), U.S. Air Force general
- Rachel Rodriguez-Williams (M.S., 2012), American politician
- Jason Saine (B.S., 2012), American politician
- Tony L. Whitehead (B.S., 2020), retired U.S. Air Force Chief Master Sergeant
