= Marsha J. Evans =

United States admiral

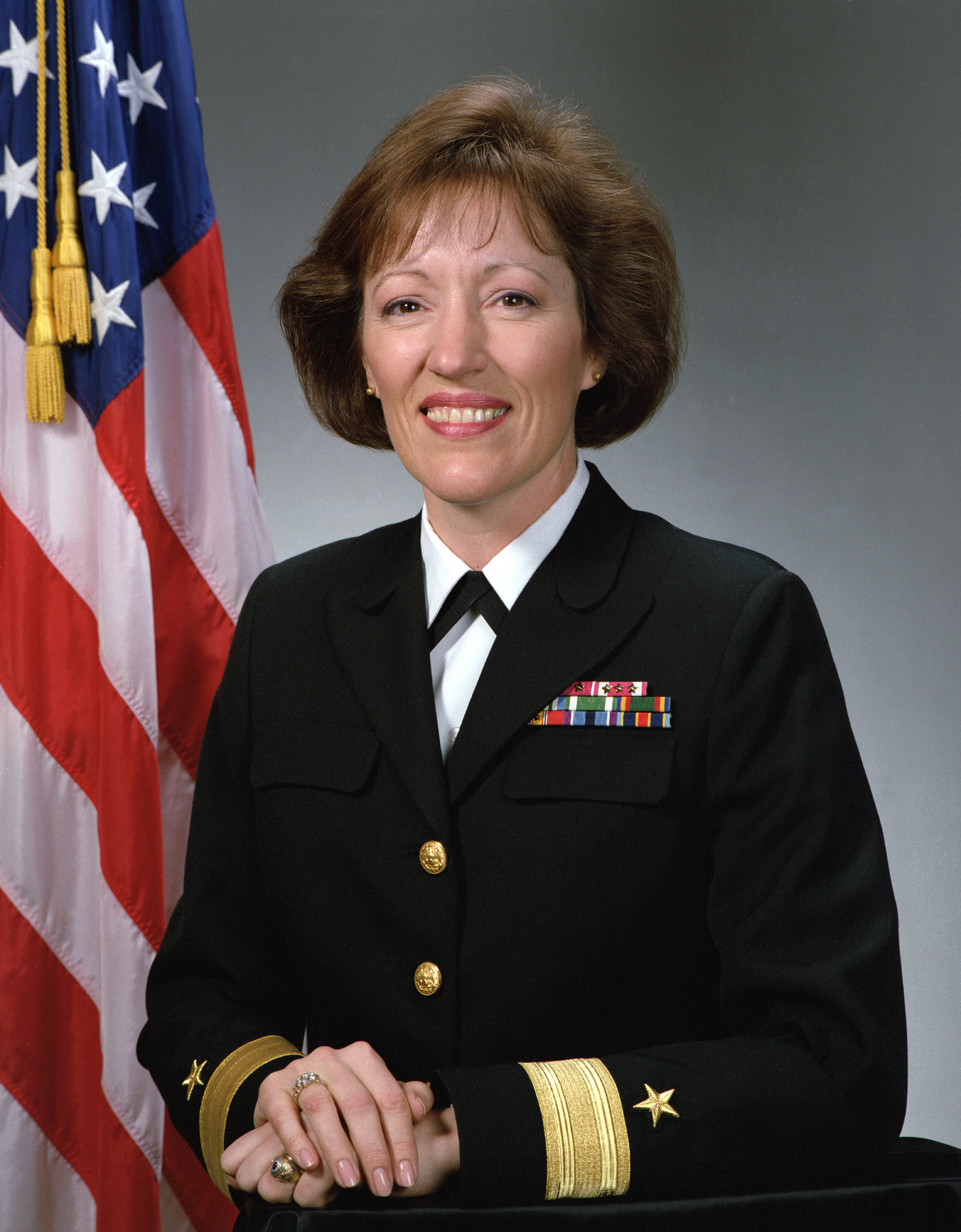
Rear Admiral Evans in 1993

Marsha Johnson "Marty" Evans (born 1947) is a retired rear admiral in the United States Navy. Following her retirement from the Navy, she served as executive director of the Girl Scouts of the USA from 1998 to 2002, and president and CEO of the American Red Cross from 2002 to 2005.

She was the interim commissioner of the Ladies Professional Golf Association (LPGA) for three months in 2009. She assumed the position on July 13, 2009, upon the resignation of former commissioner Carolyn Bivens. Michael Whan replaced her as the permanent commissioner in late October 2009.

== Early life and education ==
Born in Springfield, Illinois, Evans earned a bachelor's degree in diplomacy and world affairs from Occidental College in 1968. She later earned a master's degree in law and diplomacy at the Fletcher School of Law and Diplomacy at Tufts University. She did additional study at the Naval War College in Newport, Rhode Island, and the National War College in Washington, D.C.

== Military career ==
Evans served nearly 30 years in the United States Navy, eventually achieving the rank of rear admiral. She was commissioned an ensign following graduation from Women's Officer School at Newport, Rhode Island and was designated as a general unrestricted line officer. Her early assignments included duty with the Defense Intelligence Agency; Office of the Commander, Fleet Air Western Pacific staff, Atsugi, Japan; and Office of the Chief of Naval Operations (OP-04). In 1973, she became the first woman surface assignments officer in the Bureau of Naval Personnel and concurrently served as senior Navy social aide to the President of the United States.

Following selection as a Chief of Naval Operations Scholar in 1975, Evans earned a master's degree in law and diplomacy at the Fletcher School of Law and Diplomacy, Tufts University. Subsequently, she served as the Middle East policy officer on the staff of the Commander in Chief, U.S. Naval Forces Europe. Selected as a White House Fellow in 1979, she served a one-year fellowship as executive secretary and special assistant to the Secretary of the Treasury. In early 1981, she became the deputy director of the President's Commission on White House Fellowships.

In 1982, Evans was assigned as executive officer of Recruit Training Command, Naval Training Center San Diego, and from 1984 to 1986 as commanding officer of Naval Technical Training Center, Treasure Island, San Francisco. She served the next two years as a battalion officer at the U.S. Naval Academy. During that assignment, she also chaired the Women Midshipmen Study Group, served on the Navy's 1987 Women's Study, and taught classes in international relations.

In 1989, Evans began a one-year assignment as chief of staff of Naval Base San Francisco. On 15 June 1990, she assumed command of Naval Station Treasure Island in San Francisco, becoming the first woman to command a U.S. naval station. In November 1991, she returned to the Naval Academy as chief of staff, an assignment that was curtailed in August 1992 when she became the executive director of the Standing Committee on Military and Civilian Women in the Department of the Navy. In this capacity, she chaired a task force that developed a strategy to address gender-based issues in the U.S. Navy in the wake of the Tailhook scandal.

From June 1993 to July 1995, Evans served as the commander of the Navy Recruiting Command and became superintendent of the Naval Postgraduate School on 8 Sep 1995. She has also served for seven months as the interim director of the George C. Marshall European Center for Security Studies in Garmisch, Germany.

Evans is a graduate of the U.S. Naval War College off-campus program and a 1989 graduate of the National War College. She retired from the Navy in 1998.

== Post-military career ==
After retiring from the military, Evans was named executive director of the Girl Scouts of the USA. She held that position from 1998 through 2002. In 2002 she became president and chief executive officer of the American Red Cross. She resigned under pressure in 2005 following a series of disagreements with the organization's board of directors, accepting a severance package valued at $780,000

She was a director of Lehman Brothers until the company declared bankruptcy in 2008.

She was appointed to the board of directors of the LPGA by then-Commissioner Carolyn Bivens in early 2009, after serving on the commissioner's advisory council in 2007 and 2008. In addition to serving on the LPGA board, Evans also serves on the boards of Office Depot, Weight Watchers International, Huntsman and the U.S. Naval Academy Foundation. In 2008, she earned $953,000 in cash and other compensation in exchange for her service on these boards.

Evans also engages in public speaking where her booking fee is between $20,000 and $30,000 per speech.

== Personal life ==
Evans is married to Jerry Evans, a retired captain in the U.S. Navy and a Naval Aviator. She and her husband live in Jacksonville Beach, Florida.
