= White House Fellows =

Staff of the U.S. president

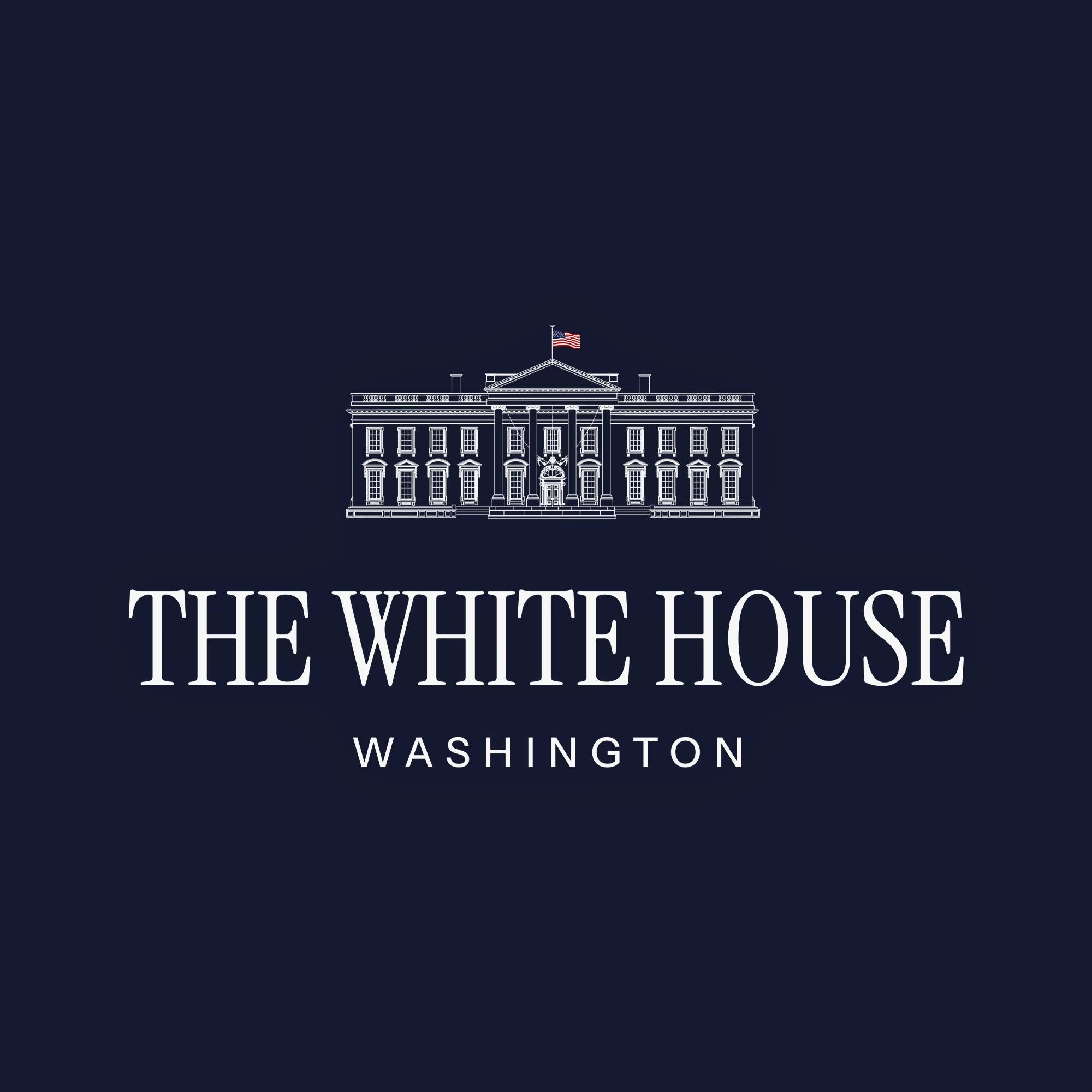

Agency overview
- Formed: October 3, 1964; 62 years ago
- Headquarters: 712 Jackson Place, Washington, D.C., U.S.
- Agency executive: Mary Sprowls, Director
- Parent agency: White House Office
- Website: trumpwhitehouse.archives.gov/get-involved/fellows/

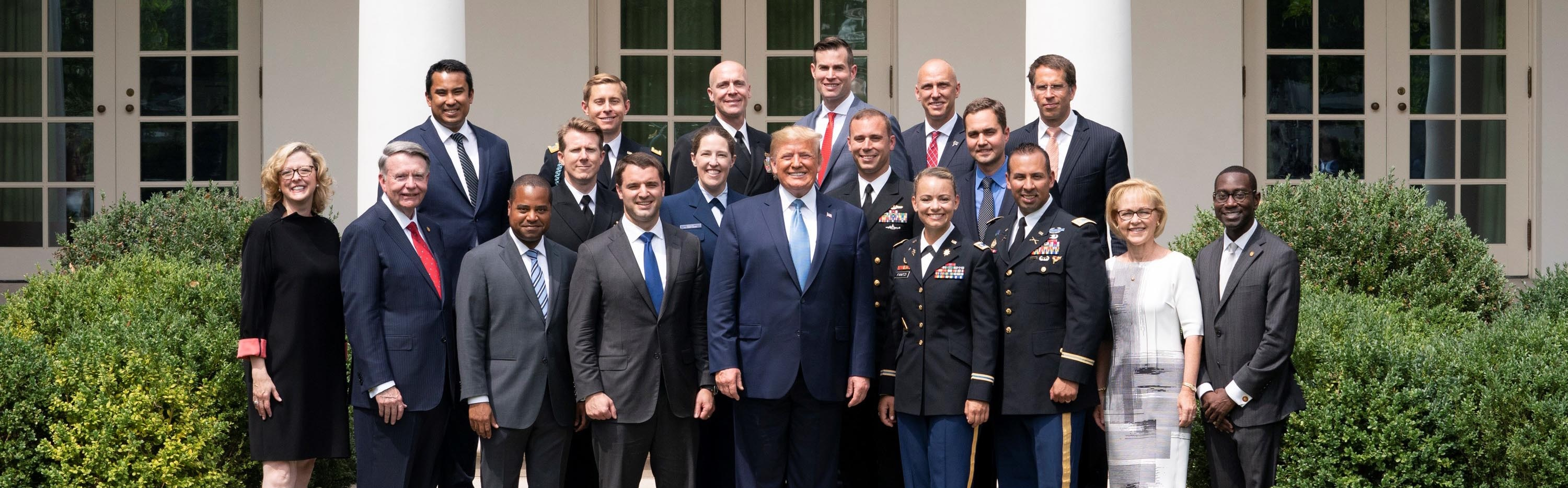
The 2018–2019 White House fellows with President Donald Trump outside of the White House.

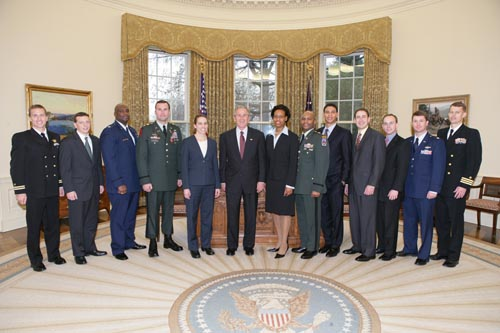
The 2005–2006 White House fellows, including Dan Caine, with President George W. Bush.

The 1990–1991 White House fellows, including Sam Brownback, in the Oval Office with President George H. W. Bush.

The 1983–1984 White House fellows, including Elaine Chao, outside of the White House.

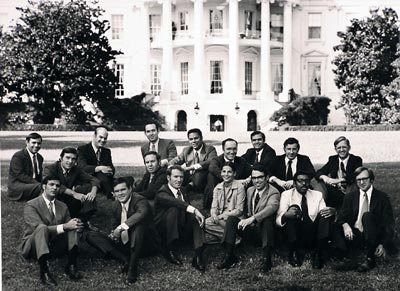
The 1972–1973 White House fellows, including Colin Powell, outside of the White House.

The White House Fellows program is a non-partisan fellowship established via Executive Order 11183 by President Lyndon B. Johnson in October 1964. The fellowship is the nation's most prestigious fellowship for leadership development and public service, offering U.S. citizens experience working at the highest levels of the federal government. The fellowship was founded based upon a suggestion from John W. Gardner, then the president of Carnegie Corporation and later the sixth secretary of health, education, and welfare.

White House fellows spend a year working as a full-time, paid special assistant or advisor to senior White House staff, cabinet secretaries, the vice president, or the head of an independent executive-branch agency. Fellows also participate in an education program consisting of roundtable discussions with leaders from the private and public sectors. These roundtables are augmented through observation of policy in action, including domestic and international engagements with foreign dignitaries, industry executives, elected officials, and civil servants.

The selection process to become a White House fellow is very competitive, with fellowships awarded on a strictly non-partisan basis. Each year after the application period closes, the staff of the President's Commission on White House Fellowships (PCWHF) processes the applications and former fellows screen the applications to identify approximately one hundred of the most promising candidates. These selected individuals are then interviewed by several regional panels, which are composed of prominent local citizens. Based on the results of these interviews, the regional panelists and the director of the PCWHF select approximately thirty candidates to proceed as national finalists. The PCWHF will then interview these finalists, recommending between 11 and 19 of them to the president for a one-year appointment through the White House Office. The program can receive more than 2,000 applicants per year, with a selection rate often of 1% or lower. Selected civilians serve as Schedule A presidential appointees, while military members will be assigned to duty at the PCWHF at 712 Jackson Place, Washington, D.C.

Once fellows complete their year of service, they join hundreds of other fellows as alumni of the program. The White House Fellows Foundation and Association is the organization that represents the White House Fellows alumni efforts, leadership events and fundraising activities.

== Demographics ==
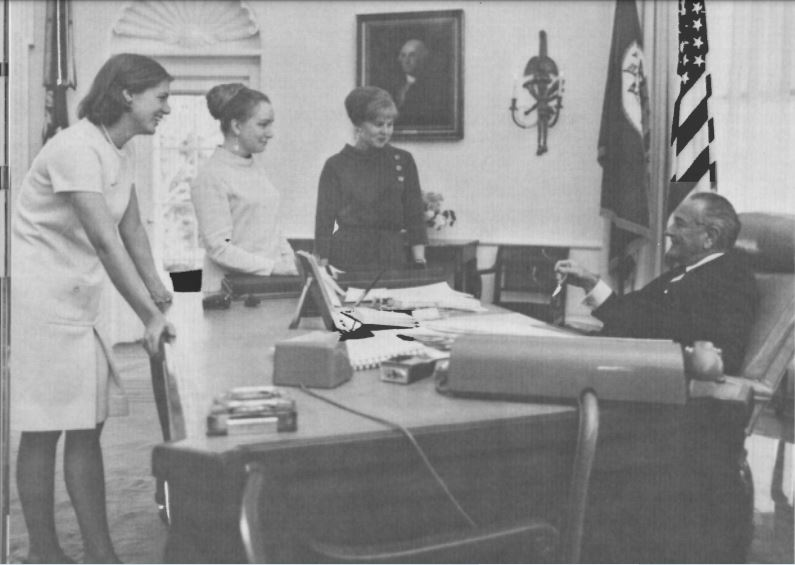
President Lyndon B. Johnson, who created the fellowship program in 1964, visits with three White House fellows in the Oval Office.

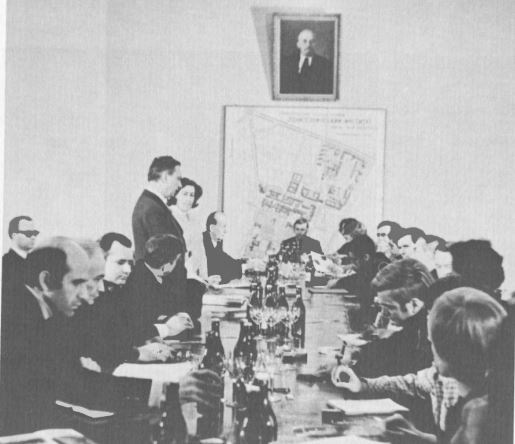
White House fellows receive an address at the Leningrad Polytechnical Institute, U.S.S.R. (1970s).

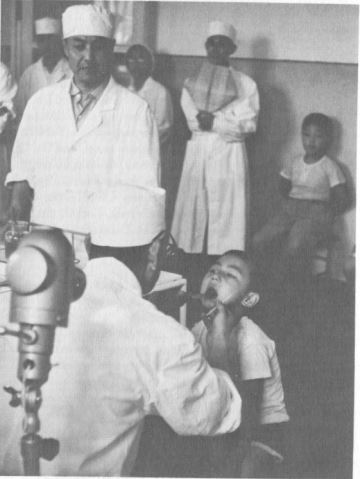
White House fellows visit a teaching hospital in the People's Republic of China (1970s).

When the White House Fellows program was established in 1964, the program required that all fellows meet the following criteria:

- Have demonstrated unusual ability, high moral character, outstanding motivation, and a broad capacity for leadership
- Show exceptional promise of future development
- Are dedicated to the institutions of the United States and the values of American civilization
- Will have attained the age of twenty-three but not the age of thirty-six prior to the beginning of their service
- Shall be selected by the president without discrimination on the basis of sex, race, color, creed, national origin, or political affiliation
- Citizens of the United States

These initial criteria have been slightly modified over the years. In 1976, criteria were modified to disqualify regular federal employees and reaffirm that military personnel remained eligible. This same executive order decreased the term of the fellowship from 15 months to 12 (though EO 12653 again revised the duration to be extended at the commission's discretion back up to 15 months).

In 1977, President Jimmy Carter revised the criteria again under Executive Order 12012. In this case, the explicit age requirement was removed. Instead, an emphasis was added such that fellows must be "...early in their chosen careers..."

Since the inception of the program, White House fellows have come from a variety of backgrounds.

- The ten universities most frequently attended by White House fellows are, in order: Harvard, Stanford, West Point, Oxford, MIT, Columbia, the Air Force Academy, the Naval Academy, Berkeley, and Yale.
- The average age of a fellow is mid-30s.
- A total of 251 women have been selected as White House fellows since the program's creation in 1964. They represent 28% of the 879 people who have served as White House fellows. The percentage of women has increased over time, as shown by the statistics below:
  - 1960s: 7 of 86 – 8% women
  - 1970s: 36 of 158 – 23% women
  - 1980s: 33 of 135 – 24% women
  - 1990s: 52 of 159 – 33% women
  - 2000s: 38 of 131 – 29% women
  - 2010s: 54 of 145 – 37% women
  - 2020s: 31 of 63 – 49% women
- A broad range of career backgrounds are represented. Fellows' professions include physicians, lawyers, teachers, military officers, scientists, non-profit leaders, engineers, CEOs, entrepreneurs, academics, and many more.

=== Undergraduate education ===
- Earned bachelor's degree: 100%
- Attended an Ivy League university: 18%
- Attended a military academy: 19%
- Graduated Phi Beta Kappa: 12%
- Rhodes scholar: 2%

=== Graduate education ===
- Earned a graduate degree of any kind: 96%
- Earned a graduate degree from an Ivy League university: 41%

== Notable alumni ==
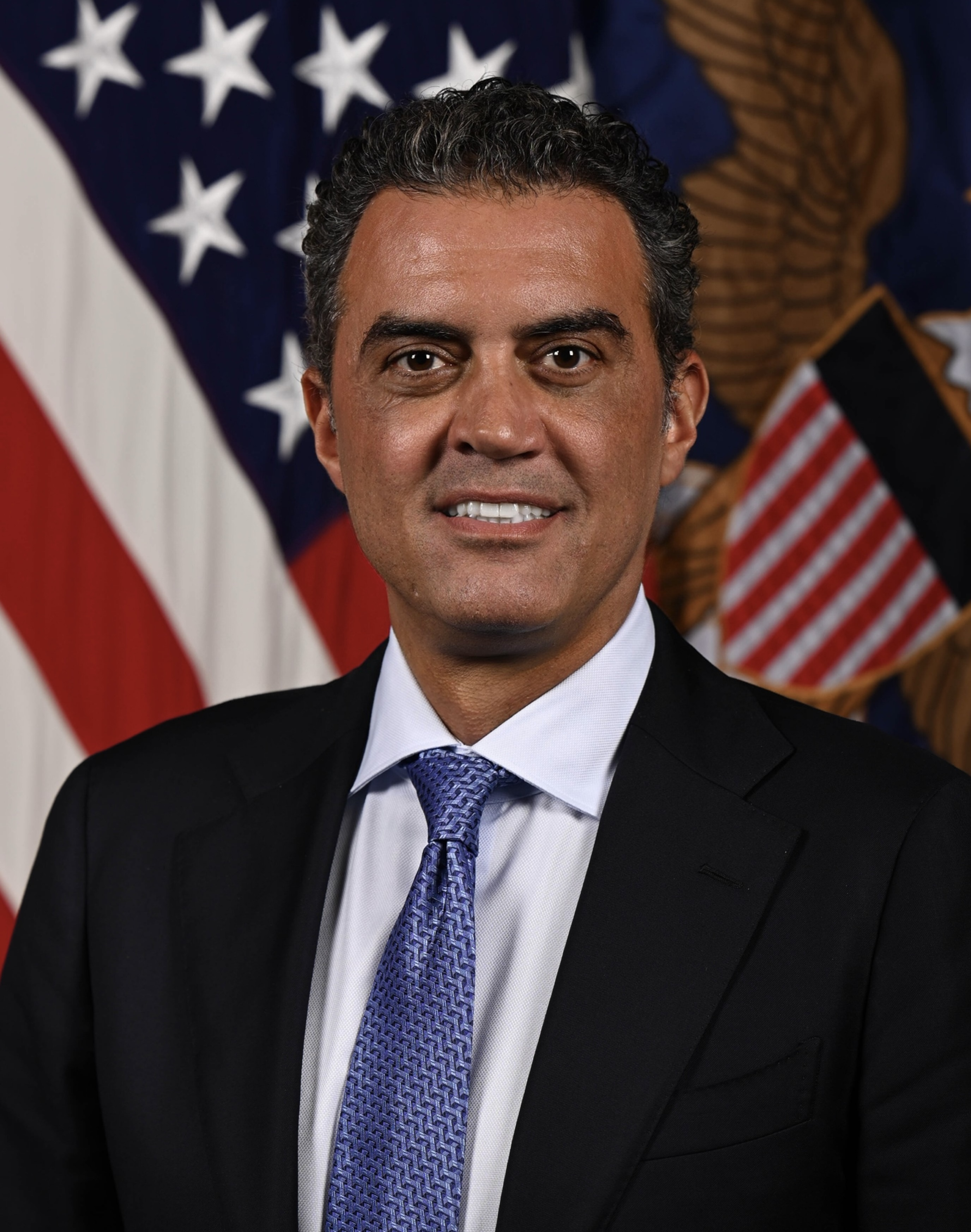
Under Secretary of Defense for Research and Engineering Emil Michael served as a White House fellow from 2009 to 2010.

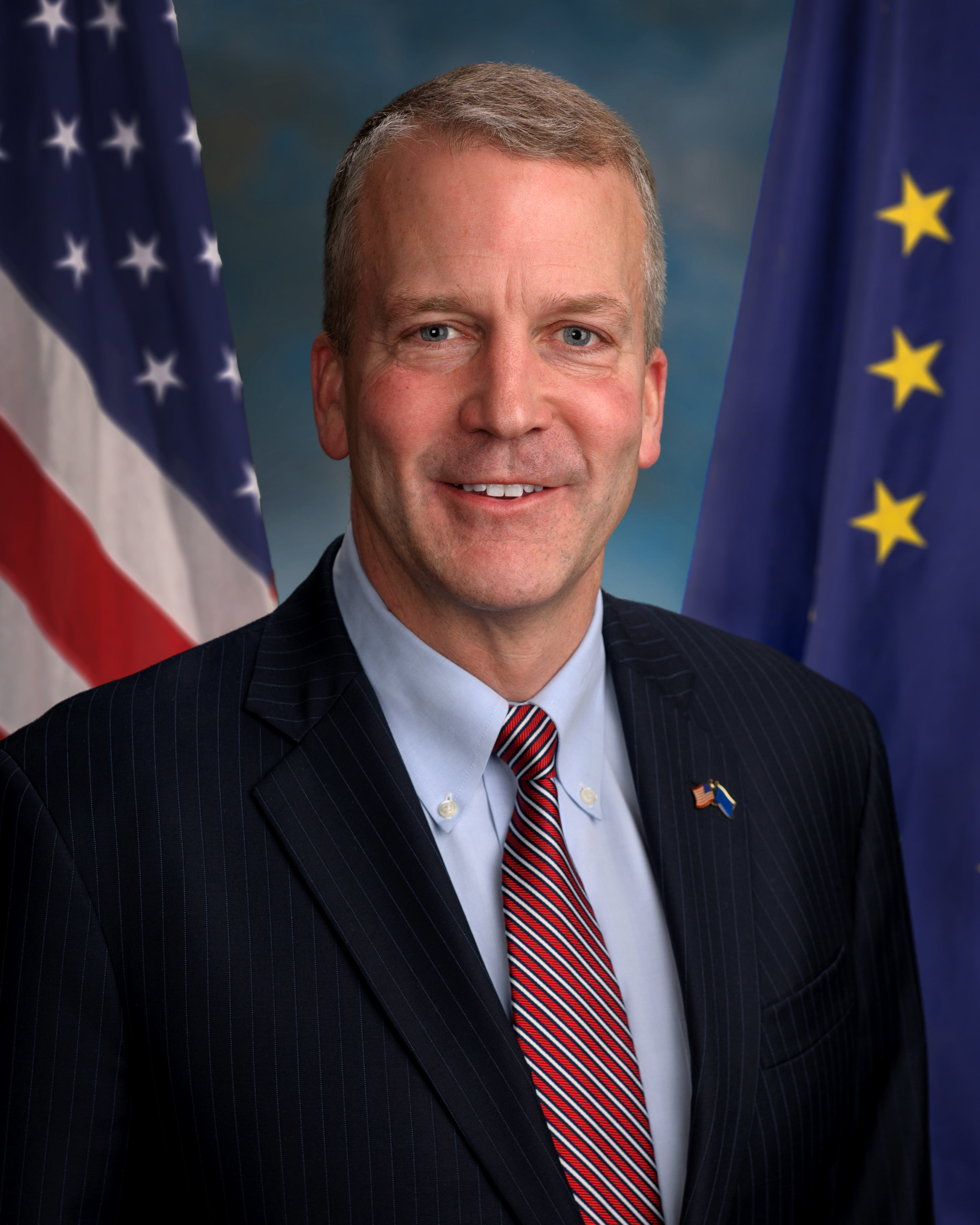
U.S. senator Dan Sullivan (AK) served as a White House fellow from 2002 to 2003.

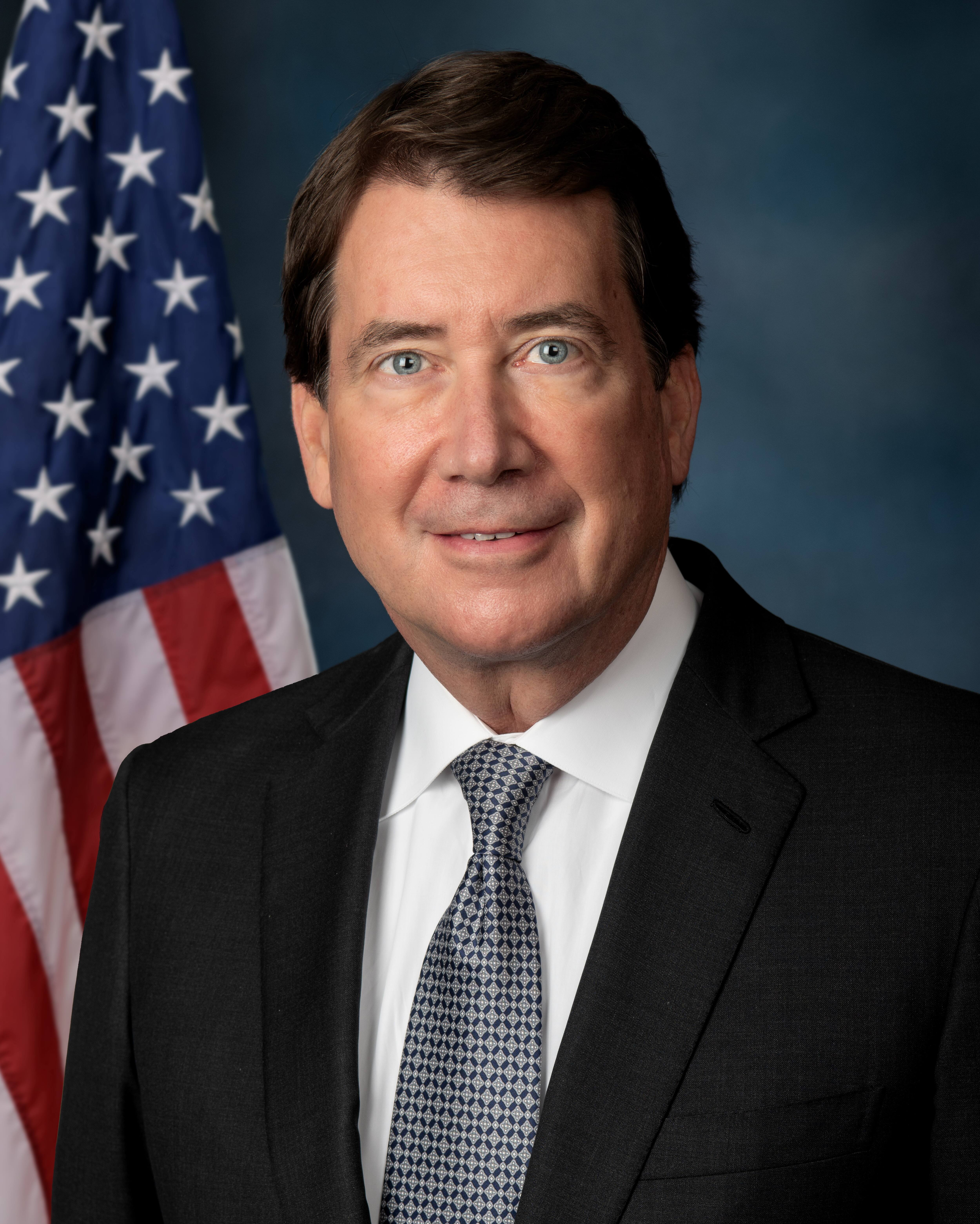
U.S. senator Bill Hagerty (TN) served as a White House fellow from 1991 to 1992.

- 1965–1966 Tom Johnson; former chairman/CEO, CNN; former publisher, Los Angeles Times.
- 1966–1967 Jane Cahill Pfeiffer; former chairman, NBC.
- 1966–1967 Samuel H. Howard; Senior Vice President, Financial Executives Institute; chairman, Federation of American Hospitals; Member of Bipartisan Commission on Medicare under President Bill Clinton; Member of Commission on Social Security under President Ronald Reagan; former national chairman, Easter Seals.
- 1967–1968 Preston Townley; former CEO, the Conference Board, former dean, Carlson School of Management, University of Minnesota
- 1967–1968 Tim Wirth; President, United Nations Foundation; Former Under Secretary of State for Global Affairs; former Senator, Colorado.
- 1968–1969 Robert D. Haas; Chairman/CEO, Levi Strauss & Company.
- 1969–1970 Michael H. Armacost; former president, the Brookings Institution; former ambassador to Japan and the Philippines; former under secretary of state for political affairs.
- 1969–1970 Percy A. Pierre; former assistant secretary of the U. S. Army for Research, Development and Acquisition, Acting Secretary of the U.S. Army; President, Prairie View A&M University.
- 1970–1971 Dana G. Mead; former chairman/CEO, Tenneco, Inc.
- 1971–1972 Robert C. McFarlane; former national security advisor to President Ronald Reagan.
- 1971–1972 Deanell R. Tacha; Judge, United States Court of Appeals for the Tenth Circuit.
- 1972–1973 Luis G. Nogales; former CEO, United Press International; former president, Univision.
- 1972–1973 Joseph P. Carroll; founding president – Secrétaire Perpetuel, Association du Mécénat de l'Institut; founding, resident – Secrétaire Perpetuel, the American Friends of the Guimet Foundation; emeritus member- Board of Visitors, School of Engineering and Applied Science, Columbia University; Philanthropist.
- 1972–1973 Colin Powell; former secretary, U.S. Department of State; former chairman, Joint Chiefs of Staff; founding chairman, America's Promise; General, U.S. Army (Ret).
- 1973–1974 Doris M. Meissner; Senior Fellow, Migration Policy Institute; former commissioner, Immigration and Naturalization Service.
- 1973–1974 Peter M. Dawkins; Vice Chairman, CitiGroup Private Bank; former chairman/CEO of Primerica Financial Services, Inc.; Heisman Trophy winner; Brigadier General, U.S. Army (Ret).
- 1973–1974 Frederick S. Benson III; President, United States – New Zealand Council; former vice president, Weyerhaeuser Company;
- 1973–1974 Delano Meriwether; Leukemia researcher.
- 1974–1975 Roger B. Porter; Professor, John F. Kennedy School of Government, Harvard University.
- 1974–1975 Garrey E. Carruthers; President/CEO, Cimarron Health Plan; former governor of New Mexico.
- 1975–1976 Marshall N. Carter; former chairman/CEO, State Street Bank & Trust Company.
- 1975–1976 Wesley K. Clark; retired general, U.S. Army (Ret); former Supreme Allied Commander, Europe.
- 1975–1976 Dennis C. Blair; Admiral, U.S. Navy (Ret); former director of national intelligence; former president, Institute for Defense Analyses; former commander in chief, U.S. Pacific Command.
- 1976–1977 Lynn A. Schenk; former congresswoman, California.
- 1976–1977 Charles A. Ansbacher; Conductor, Boston Landmarks Orchestra.
- 1977–1978 Nelson A. Diaz; Partner, Blank Rome LLP; former city solicitor, City of Philadelphia; former general counsel, U.S. Department of Housing and Urban Development.
- 1979–1980 Lincoln Caplan; author, journalist, Truman Capote Visiting Lecturer in Law and Senior Research Scholar in Law at Yale Law School.
- 1979–1980 Victoria Chan-Palay; neuroscientist, University of Zurich Medical School.
- 1979–1980 Anne Cohn Donnelly; former executive director, National Commission for Prevention of Child Abuse.
- 1979–1980 Marsha J. Evans; President/CEO of American Red Cross; former national executive director of the Girl Scouts of the USA; Rear Admiral, U.S. Navy (Ret).
- 1980–1981 Joan Abrahamson; President, the Jefferson Institute; President, Jonas Salk Foundation.
- 1980–1981 Thomas J. Campbell; former U.S. congressman, California.
- 1980–1981 M. Margaret McKeown; Judge, U.S. Court of Appeals for the 9th Circuit.
- 1981–1982 Paul V. Applegarth; CEO, Value Enhancement International; former founding managing director, the Emerging Africa Infrastructure Fund; former founding CEO, the Millennium Challenge Corporation.
- 1981–1982 Joe L. Barton; U.S. congressman, Texas.
- 1981–1982 Myron E. Ullman; former CEO, Louis Vuitton Moet Hennessy; former chairman/CEO, DFS Group, LTD; former chairman/CEO, R.H. Macy & Company; Chairman & CEO, J.C. Penney.
- 1982–1983 Scott Gration, USAF Major General (Ret) and US special envoy to Sudan.
- 1982–1983 William L. Roper; Dean, School of Medicine, Vice Chairman for Medical Affairs, and CEO, UNC Health Care system, University of North Carolina at Chapel Hill.
- 1982–1983 Frank Klotz; Lieutenant General, US Air Force; Assistant Vice Chief of Staff, director Air Force Staff (Ret).
- 1982–1983 Douglas Kmiec; former U.S. ambassador to Malta; United States assistant attorney general for the Office of Legal Counsel.
- 1983–1984 Elaine Chao; former secretary, U.S. Department of Transportation; former secretary, U.S. Department of Labor; former president/CEO, United Way of America; former director, Peace Corps.
- 1983–1984 Mufi Hannemann; Mayor, City and County of Honolulu.
- 1984–1985 Tom Leppert; Mayor of Dallas; former CEO of Turner Construction Company.
- 1984–1985 Rick Stamberger; President and CEO, SmartBrief.
- 1985–1986 Ann E. Rondeau; President Naval Postgraduate School; U.S. Navy Vice Admiral (Ret).
- 1986–1987 Paul A. Gigot; Editor, editorial page, The Wall Street Journal.
- 1986–1987 William J. Lennox, Jr.; Lt. General, U.S. Army; Superintendent, United States Military Academy (Ret).
- 1987–1988 Mary Schiavo; Inspector General, U.S. Department of Transportation; Author, Flying Blind, Flying Safe; Attorney
- 1988–1989 Jeff Colyer; Governor of Kansas, plastic surgeon, and former Kansas representative.
- 1988–1989 Charles Patrick Garcia; chairman, Board of Visitors, United States Air Force Academy; former CEO, Sterling Financial Group of Companies; best-selling author of A Message From Garcia and Leadership Lessons of the White House Fellows.
- 1988–1989 Patrick M. Walsh; retired United States Navy Admiral, former commander, U.S. Pacific Fleet, Vice Chief of Naval Operations and Blue Angels pilot (Ret).
- 1990–1991 Samuel D. Brownback; former U.S. senator, Kansas; former governor of Kansas.
- 1991–1992 Margarita Colmenares; first Latina engineer at Chevron.
- 1991–1992 Raymond E. Johns, Jr.; General, US Air Force; Commander, Air Mobility Command (Ret).
- 1991–1992 Bill Hagerty; U.S. senator, Tennessee; former U.S. ambassador to Japan.
- 1992–1993 Kurt M. Campbell; 22nd U.S. deputy secretary of state and 24th assistant secretary of state for East Asian and Pacific affairs
- 1992–1993 Robert L. Gordon III; Deputy Under-Secretary of Defense, Military Community, and Family Policy.
- 1993–1994 Paul Antony; Chief Medical Officer, PhRMA and retired U.S. Navy Commander.
- 1993–1994 W. Scott Gould; Deputy Secretary of Veterans Affairs.
- 1993–1994 Jami Floyd; Journalist and media personality.
- 1994–1995 Wifredo Ferrer; U.S. attorney for the Southern District of Florida.
- 1994–1995 David Iglesias, U.S. attorney for the District of New Mexico; U.S. Navy Captain and Judge Advocate General (Ret); and Director of the Wheaton Center for Faith, Politics & Economics.
- 1995-1996 Teresa Leger Fernández; Congresswoman from New Mexico's 3rd congressional district.
- 1995–1996 Kinney Zalesne; co-author of bestselling book and Wall Street Journal column Microtrends.
- 1996–1997 Brenda Berkman; first female FDNY firefighter.
- 1997–1998 Sanjay Gupta; CNN senior medical correspondent; neurosurgeon.
- 1997–1998 Brad Carson, 21st president of the University of Tulsa; Under Secretary of the Army; General Counsel of the Army; Member of the U.S. House of Representatives (OK-2).
- 1998–1999 Juan M. Garcia; Assistant Secretary of the Navy for Manpower, former representative District 32, Texas House of Representatives.
- 1998–1999 John K. Tien; 8th U.S. deputy secretary of homeland security and retired Army Colonel.
- 1998–1999 Carlos Del Toro; 78th U.S. secretary of the navy and retired Navy commander.
- 2000–2001 Dave Aronberg; Florida state senator, District 27.
- 2001–2002 Steve Poizner; California state insurance commissioner.
- 2001–2002 Kris Kobach; 45th Kansas attorney general; 31st Kansas secretary of state (2011–2019).
- 2002–2003 Daniel S. Sullivan; Senator from Alaska.
- 2002–2003 Richard Greco Jr., Assistant Secretary of the Navy (Financial Management and Comptroller).
- 2004–2005 Jerry L. Johnson, managing director of RLJ Equity Partners.
- 2004–2005 Louis O'Neill, Ambassador to Moldova (OSCE Mission).
- 2005–2006 Dan Caine; Chairman of the Joint Chiefs of Staff and US Air Force lieutenant general.
- 2005–2006 Eric Greitens; 56th governor of Missouri and former Navy SEAL.
- 2005–2006 Robert Reffkin; co-founder and CEO of Compass, Inc.
- 2006–2007 Wes Moore; Governor of Maryland; former CEO of the Robin Hood Foundation.
- 2008–2009 Nicole Malachowski; US Air Force Colonel (Ret) and first woman to be a pilot with the Thunderbirds.
- 2009–2010 Emil Michael; Under Secretary of Defense for Research and Engineering.
- 2011–2012 L. Felice Gorordo; Acting U.S. executive director of the World Bank and U.S. alternate executive director of the World Bank
- 2011–2012 Anthony Woods, secretary of the Maryland Department of Veterans Affairs.
- 2013–2014 Elliot Ackerman; author and Marine Corps veteran.
- 2015–2016 Lashanda Holmes; first African-American female helicopter pilot for the Coast Guard.
- 2015–2016 Shereef Elnahal; Under Secretary of Veterans Affairs for Health; first Muslim American New Jersey cabinet member.
- 2016–2017 Sharice Davids; Congresswoman from Kansas's 3rd congressional district.
- 2018–2019 Clay Fuller; Congressman from Georgia's 14th congressional district.
- 2020-2021 Pia Dandiya; Congresswoman from Florida’s 22nd congressional district.
- 2024–2025 Nicholas Dockery; Medal of Honor recipient

== The President's Commission on White House Fellowships ==
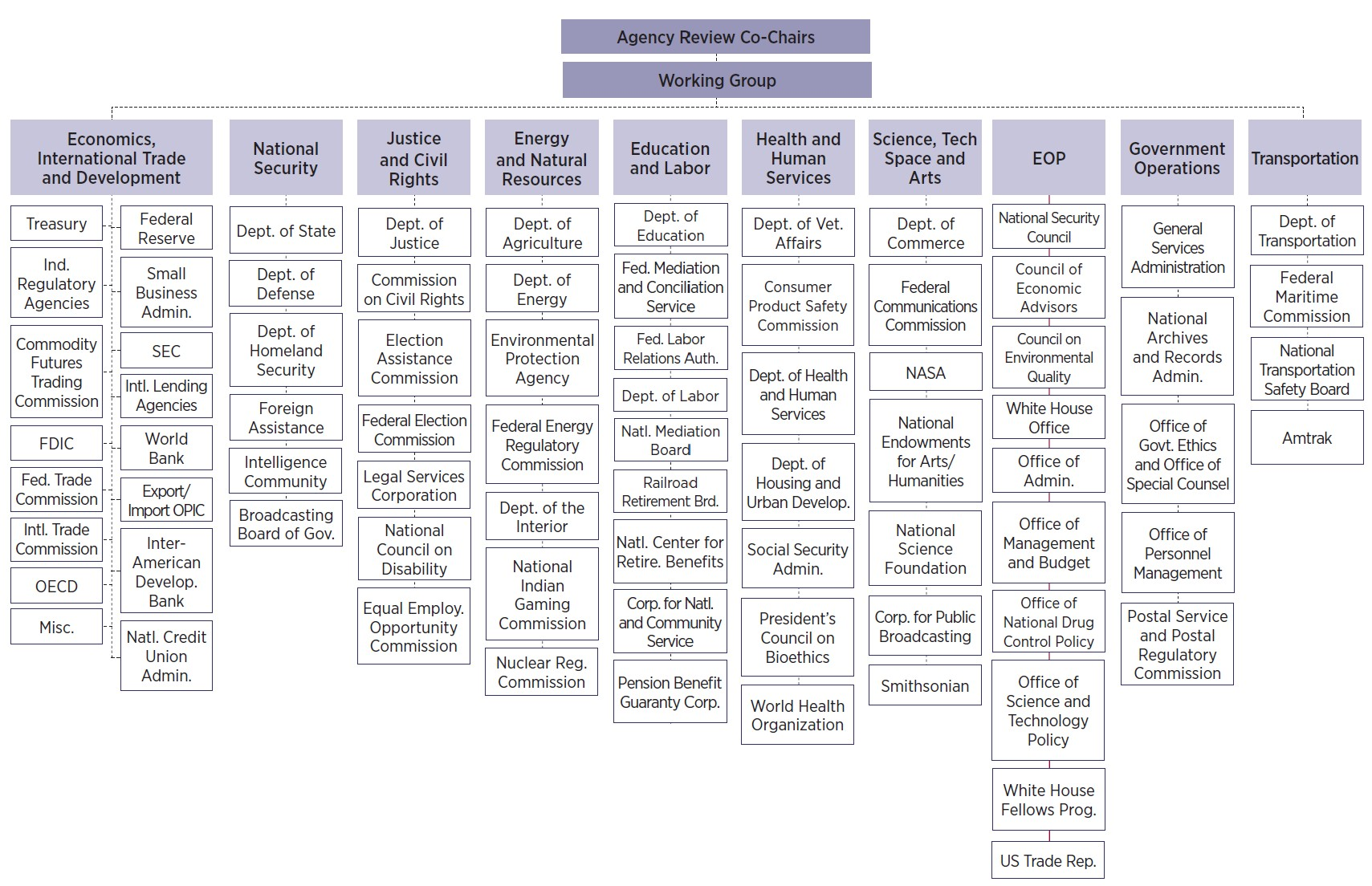
2020 transition planning chart showing the White House Fellows program.

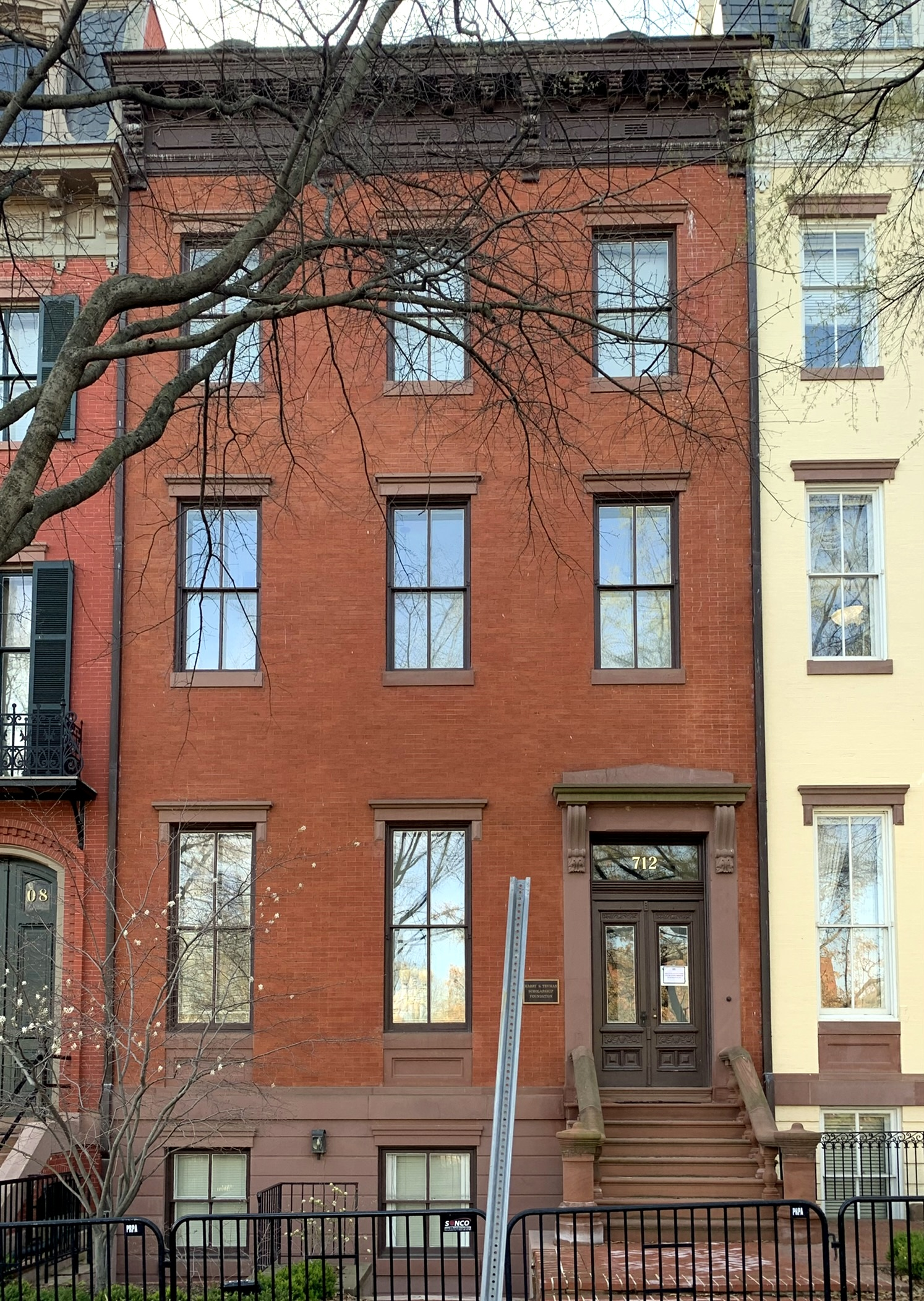
White House Fellows building at 712 Jackson Place in Washington, D.C.

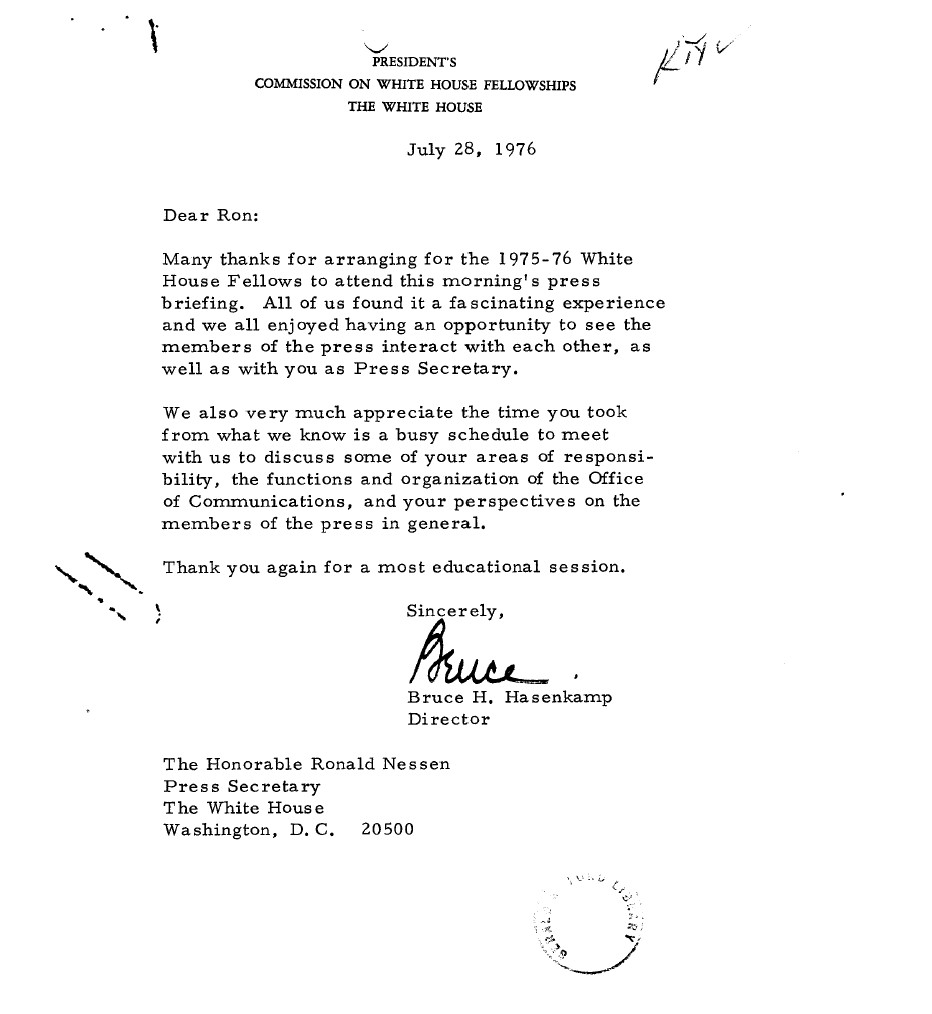
Letter from President's Commission on White House Fellowships Director Hasenkamp to US Press Secretary Ronald Nessen in 1976

The President's Commission on White House Fellowships (PCWHF) consists of the program office (the director, staff, and White House Fellows) and the commission (the commissioners and their chairperson). The White House Fellows program is a subunit of the White House Office and is located on the 18 acres of the White House grounds. The director of the PCWHF is appointed by the president, serves as the designated federal officer for the commission, and is supported by a team of staff members. The director is responsible for administering all aspects of the program. The commission meets twice a year and reports to the president of the United States through the Executive Office of the President. The commission's responsibility is to recommend candidates to the president for selection as White House fellows. The commissioners help recruit a diverse group of applicants, screen the applicants, and makes recommendations to the president.

Chairs of the commission overseeing the White House Fellows Program include

- 2021–25: Demetra Lambros
- 2017–21: Robert M. "Mike" Duncan
- 2014–16: Mary Zients
- 2009–14: John R. Phillips
- 2006–09: Myrna Blyth
- 2003–06: Julie Nixon Eisenhower
- 2001–03: Bradford Freeman
- 1994–2001: Marjorie Benton
- 1993–94: Nancy Bekavac
- 1990–93: Ronna Romney
- 1981–89: James B. Stockdale
- 1977–81: John W. Gardner
- 1975–77: Miles W. Kirkpatrick
- 1972–75: Francis L. Dale
- 1971–72: Charles B. Thornton
- 1969–71: Arthur S. Flemming
- 1968–69: William H. Hastie
- 1966–68: C. Douglas Dillon
- 1964–66: David Rockefeller

Commissioners overseeing the White House Fellows Program have included:

- Dan Caine, Chairman of the Joint Chiefs of Staff
- Michael Rigas, Deputy Secretary of State for Management and Resources
- Somers Farkas, United States Ambassador to Malta
- Raumesh Akbari, Member of the Tennessee Senate
- Joseph Patrick Kennedy III, former Congressman for Massachusetts's 4th congressional district, United States Special Envoy for Northern Ireland
- Hildy Kuryk, former National Finance Director for Democratic National Committee
- Ramona Romero, Vice President of Princeton University
- Fidel Vargas, President of Hispanic Scholarship Fund
- Wesley Clark, former NATO commander and U.S. Army General
- Tom Brokaw, NBC news
- Julie Nixon Eisenhower, daughter of President Richard Nixon
- Tom Daschle, former Senate majority leader
- John H. Frey, CT State Representative and RNC National Committeeman
- Vartan Gregorian, President of the Carnegie Corporation of New York
- Claudia J. Kennedy, United States Army Lieutenant General
- Maya Lin, Artist
- George Muñoz, former President of the Overseas Private Investment Corporation
- Pierre Omidyar, Founder of eBay
- Paul Sarbanes, former United States Senator from Maryland
- Ruth J. Simmons, President of Brown University
- James Stockdale, Navy Admiral, Author, Vietnam POW, Medal of Honor recipient
- Laurence Tribe, Harvard constitutional scholar
- Gaddi H. Vasquez, former Director of the Peace Corps
- Cindy S. Moelis, President of the Pritzker Traubert Foundation
- Janet Eissenstat, Assistant Chief of Protocol for the United States of America under President George W. Bush

=== Directors of the President's Commission on White House Fellowships ===
- Mary Sprowls
- Rose Vela
- Elizabeth Pinkerton
- Jennifer Kaplan
- Cindy Moelis
- Janet Eissenstat
- Jocelyn White
- Jacqueline Blumenthal
- James C. Roberts
- Bruce H. Hasenkamp

== The White House Fellows Foundation & Association ==
The White House Fellows Foundation & Association (WHFFA) is a 501(c)(3) nonprofit dedicated to "supporting the White House Fellows educational program financially, to broaden the foundation members’ understanding of government and the problems confronting government, and to encourage members’ contribution to public service and the education of the public." Activities funded by the WHFFA support alumni and current cohort members. This includes supporting a portion of seminar costs for the White House Fellows' educational program, an annual meeting of alumni, and recruiting applicants for the White House Fellows program.

The WHFFA is governed by a board of directors who are voted on by dues paying members. The board has the authority to hire an executive director to conduct affairs on behalf of the WHFFA. Only White House Fellows alumni are eligible to join the WHFFA. The WHFFA revenue is derived from member dues, investment income, and donations. The WHFFA president is an ex officio member of the PCWHF.

== Programs inspired by the White House Fellows ==
Due to the successes and longevity of the White House Fellows program, latter administrations have introduced other distinct fellowships with similar names. Though the White House Fellows program is the only dedicated to service at the highest levels of government and the only administered from within the White House, these more recent programs have succeeded in serving their unique objectives over the years.

=== Presidential Management Fellows ===
The Presidential Management Fellows program existed to recruit recent college graduates and graduate students in order to develop a core of future government leaders. Those selected were hired at federal pay grades starting at GS-9 and served for a period of two years. Presidential Management Fellows were administered via the U.S. Office of Personnel Management. More than 500 Presidential Management Fellows were selected annually, with a selection rate of approximately 10%. The Presidential Management Fellows Program was initially established as the Presidential Management Intern Program in 1977. It was discontinued in 2025.

=== Presidential Innovation Fellows ===
The Presidential Innovation Fellows Program seeks to embed industry's top technologists and innovators within federal agencies for a period of one year. The program typically recruits 20–35 fellows for each new cohort and charges them with helping to solve the nation's toughest challenges and emerging issues. The program was initiated by President Barack Obama in 2012 and later codified via the TALENT Act in 2017. It is administered by the General Services Administration.

=== White House Leadership Development Program Fellows ===
The White House Leadership Development Program is designed to provide senior level federal employees (GS-15 and equivalent) with exposure to cross-agency priority challenges. It was established by President Barack Obama on December 9, 2014. The program is sponsored by the Executive Office of the President and is administered by the General Services Administration.
