= Louis O'Neill =

Louis O'Neill may refer to:

- Louis O'Neill (diplomat)
- Louis O'Neill (politician)

== See also ==
- Louise O'Neill, Irish author
