= 2008 LPGA Tour =

Golf tour season

2008 LPGA Tour season
- Duration: January 18, 2008 – December 14, 2008
- Number of official events: 37
- Most wins: 7 (Mexico) Lorena Ochoa
- Money leader: (Mexico) Lorena Ochoa
- Rolex Player of the Year: (Mexico) Lorena Ochoa
- Vare Trophy: (Mexico) Lorena Ochoa
- Rookie of the Year: (Taiwan) Yani Tseng

The 2008 LPGA Tour was a series of weekly golf tournaments for elite female golfers from around the world that took place from February through December 2008. The tournaments were sanctioned by the United States–based Ladies Professional Golf Association (LPGA). In 2008, prize money on the LPGA Tour was $60.3 million, which was the highest in the history of the tour until 2016.

Lorena Ochoa topped the money list, earning $2,763,193. Ochoa also led the league in most wins with seven, including four consecutive tournaments in March and April and one major tournament.

The four major championships were won by: Lorena Ochoa (Kraft Nabisco Championship), Yani Tseng (LPGA Championship), Inbee Park (U.S. Women's Open), and Jiyai Shin (Women's British Open). All major winners except Ochoa were not only first-time major winners, but first-time winners on the LPGA Tour. Tseng, at 19 years old, and Park and Shin, both at 20 years old, became the youngest-ever winners of the respective majors.

On May 12, a day after winning her third tournament of the season, Annika Sörenstam announced her intent to "step away" from competitive golf at the end of the 2008 season. She continued to draw large crowds through the remainder of the season, though she did not win another tournament on the LPGA Tour before the end of the year.

Jiyai Shin, a 20-year-old non-LPGA member, set records on the LPGA Tour by winning three of the nine tournaments in which she played, including the Women's British Open and the season-ending ADT Championship with its $1 million first place prize. She became the first non-LPGA member ever to win three events.

The LPGA organization also attracted attention in 2008 when commissioner Carolyn Bivens announced a new policy in August that would have required all players who had been on the tour for two years to show proficiency in English or face suspension. The Tour rescinded the policy two weeks later after increasing criticism from the media and from LPGA Tour sponsors.

== Tournament schedule and results ==
ADT Playoff Categories:

- winner: Official LPGA Tour events with a purse of at least $2,000,000. Winners of these events automatically qualify for the ADT Championship.
- standard: Winners do not automatically qualify for the ADT Championship; the ADT points system is used.
- unofficial: These events are not official LPGA Tour events and participation is not part of the ADT Playoff system.

The number in parentheses after winners' names show the player's total number of official money, individual event wins on the LPGA Tour, including that event.

Date	Tournament	Location	ADT Playoff category	Winner	Purse ($)	Winner's share ($)
Jan 20	Women's World Cup of Golf	South Africa	unofficial	Philippines (Jennifer Rosales / Dorothy Delasin)	1,400,000	210,000
Feb 16	SBS Open at Turtle Bay	Hawaii	standard	(Sweden) Annika Sörenstam (70)	1,100,000	165,000
Feb 23	Fields Open in Hawaii	Hawaii	standard	(United States) Paula Creamer (5)	1,300,000	195,000
Mar 2	HSBC Women's Champions	Singapore	winner	(Mexico) Lorena Ochoa (18)	2,000,000	300,000
Mar 116	MasterCard Classic	Mexico	standard	(Sweden) Louise Friberg (1)	1,300,000	195,000
Mar 30	Safeway International	Arizona	standard	(Mexico) Lorena Ochoa (19)	1,500,000	225,000
Apr 6	**Kraft Nabisco Championship**	California	winner	(Mexico) Lorena Ochoa (20)	2,000,000	300,000
Apr 13	Corona Championship	Mexico	standard	(Mexico) Lorena Ochoa (21)	1,300,000	195,000
Apr 20	Ginn Open	Florida	winner	(Mexico) Lorena Ochoa (22)	2,600,000	390,000
Apr 27	Stanford International Pro-Am	Florida	winner	(Sweden) Annika Sörenstam (71)	2,000,000	300,000
May 4	SemGroup Championship	Oklahoma	standard	(United States) Paula Creamer (6)	1,800,000	270,000
May 11	Michelob ULTRA Open at Kingsmill	Virginia	winner	(Sweden) Annika Sörenstam (72)	2,200,000	330,000
May 18	Sybase Classic	New Jersey	winner	(Mexico) Lorena Ochoa (23)	2,000,000	300,000
May 25	LPGA Corning Classic	New York	standard	(United States) Leta Lindley (1)	1,500,000	225,000
Jun 1	Ginn Tribute Hosted by Annika	South Carolina	winner	(South Korea) Seon Hwa Lee (3)	2,600,000	390,000
Jun 8	**McDonald's LPGA Championship**	Maryland	winner	(Taiwan) Yani Tseng (1)	2,000,000	300,000
End of first half of the season
Jun 22	Wegmans LPGA	New York	winner	(South Korea) Eun-Hee Ji (1)	2,000,000	300,000
Jun 29	**U.S. Women's Open**	Minnesota	winner	(South Korea) Inbee Park (1)	3,250,000	585,000
Jul 6	P&G Beauty NW Arkansas Championship	Arkansas	standard	(South Korea) Seon Hwa Lee (4)	1,700,000	255,000
Jul 13	Jamie Farr Owens Corning Classic	Ohio	standard	(United States) Paula Creamer (7)	1,300,000	195,000
Jul 20	LPGA State Farm Classic	Illinois	standard	(South Korea) Ji Young Oh (1)	1,700,000	255,000
Jul 27	Evian Masters	France	winner	(Sweden) Helen Alfredsson (6)	3,250,000	487,500
Aug 3	**Ricoh Women's British Open**	England	winner	(South Korea) Jiyai Shin (1*)	2,100,000	314,464
Aug 17	CN Canadian Women's Open	Ontario	winner	(Australia) Katherine Hull (1)	2,250,000	337,500
Aug 24	Safeway Classic	Oregon	standard	(United States) Cristie Kerr (11)	1,700,000	255,000
Sep 14	Bell Micro LPGA Classic	Alabama	standard	(United States) Angela Stanford (2)	1,400,000	210,000
Sep 28	Navistar LPGA Classic	Alabama	standard	(Mexico) Lorena Ochoa (24)	1,400,000	210,000
Oct 5	Samsung World Championship	California	standard	(United States) Paula Creamer (8)	1,000,000	250,000
Oct 12	Longs Drugs Challenge	California	standard	(South Korea) In-Kyung Kim (1)	1,200,000	180,000
Oct 19	Kapalua LPGA Classic	Hawaii	standard	(United States) Morgan Pressel (2)	1,500,000	225,000
Oct 26	Grand China Air LPGA	China	standard	(Sweden) Helen Alfredsson (7)	1,800,000	270,000
Nov 2	Hana Bank-KOLON Championship	South Korea	standard	(United States) Candie Kung (4)	1,600,000	240,000
Nov 9	Mizuno Classic	Japan	standard	(South Korea) Jiyai Shin (2*)	1,400,000	210,000
Nov 16	Lorena Ochoa Invitational	Mexico	standard	(United States) Angela Stanford (3)	1,000,000	200,000
Nov 23	ADT Championship	Florida	n/a	(South Korea) Jiyai Shin (3*)	1,550,000	1,000,000
Nov 30	Lexus Cup	Singapore	unofficial	Team International	n/a	
Dec 14**	Wendy's 3-Tour Challenge	Nevada	unofficial	Champions Tour	n/a	

Tournaments in bold are majors.
**The Wendy's 3-Tour Challenge was held on November 17. It was broadcast on television on December 13 and 14. The official LPGA Tour schedule lists the tournament dates based on the date of the television broadcast.
*Shin was not an LPGA member in 2008.

== Leaders ==
Money List leaders

Rank	Player	Country	Earnings ($)	Events
1	Lorena Ochoa	Mexico	2,763,193	23
2	Paula Creamer	United States	1,823,992	26
3	Yani Tseng	Taiwan	1,752,086	27
4	Annika Sörenstam	Sweden	1,735,912	22
5	Helen Alfredsson	Sweden	1,431,408	26
6	Lee Seon-hwa	South Korea	1,187,294	30
7	Suzann Pettersen	Norway	1,177,809	24
8	Inbee Park	South Korea	1,138,370	27
9	Angela Stanford	United States	1,134,753	28
10	Cristie Kerr	United States	1,108,839	26

Scoring Average leaders

Rank	Player	Country	Average
1	Lorena Ochoa	Mexico	69.70
2	Annika Sörenstam	Sweden	70.47
3	Paula Creamer	United States	70.56
4	Yani Tseng	Taiwan	70.77
5	Cristie Kerr	United States	70.88

== Award winners ==
The three competitive awards given out by the LPGA each year are:

- The Rolex Player of the Year is awarded based on a formula in which points are awarded for top-10 finishes and are doubled at the LPGA's four major championships and at the season-ending ADT Championship. The points system is: 30 points for first; 12 points for second; nine points for third; seven points for fourth; six points for fifth; five points for sixth; four points for seventh; three points for eighth; two points for ninth and one point for 10th.
  - 2008 Winner: (Mexico) Lorena Ochoa. Runner-up: (United States) Paula Creamer
- The Vare Trophy, named for Glenna Collett-Vare, is given to the player with the lowest scoring average for the season.
  - 2008 Winner: (Mexico) Lorena Ochoa. Runner-up: (Sweden) Annika Sörenstam
- The Louis Suggs Rolex Rookie of the Year Award is awarded to the first-year player on the LPGA Tour who scores the highest in a points competition in which points are awarded at all full-field domestic events and doubled at the LPGA's four major championships. The points system is: 150 points for first; 80 points for second; 75 points for third; 70 points for fourth; and 65 points for fifth. After fifth place, points are awarded in increments of three, beginning at sixth place with 62 points. Rookies who make the cut in an event and finish below 41st each receive five points. The award is named after Louise Suggs, one of the founders of the LPGA.
  - 2008 Winner: (Taiwan) Yani Tseng. Runner-up: (South Korea) Na Yeon Choi

== See also ==
- 2008 in golf
- 2008 Duramed Futures Tour
- 2008 Ladies European Tour
