= Joseph F. Rice =

American lawyer (1954–2026)

- Born: Joseph Fred Rice; March 25, 1954; Winnsboro, South Carolina, U.S.
- Died: September 3, 2026 (aged 72); Mount Pleasant, South Carolina, U.S.
- Education: University of South Carolina; South Carolina Law School
- Occupation: Lawyer

Joseph Fred Rice (March 25, 1954 – September 3, 2026) was an American lawyer.

== Early life and career ==
Rice was born in Winnsboro, South Carolina, on March 25, 1954, the son of Donnie Rice Jr., a textile worker, and Betty Dunlap. His grandfather was a mill paymaster. He attended the University of South Carolina, earning his bachelor's degree in business administration in 1976. He also attended South Carolina Law School, graduating in 1979. He worked with Ronald Motley on a case involving nuclear fuel rods.

He worked with the law firm Motley, Loadholdt, Richardson & Poole P.A. In 1998, he sued tobacco companies on behalf of states, and settled for $206 million. He also negotiated a $368 billion settlement plan that collapsed in the United States Congress. In 2003, he and Motley founded Motley Rice, a plaintiffs' litigation firm in Mount Pleasant, South Carolina.

In 2023, South Carolina Law School renamed its building as the Joseph F. Rice School of Law.

== Personal life and death ==
In 1979, Rice married Lisa Summer. Their marriage lasted until Rice's death in 2026.

Rice died in Mount Pleasant, South Carolina, on September 3, 2026, at the age of 72.
