= MasterCard Classic =

Golf tournament formerly on the LPGA Tour

The MasterCard Classic Honoring Alejo Peralta was a golf tournament for professional female golfers, played on the LPGA Tour. It was played each year between 2005 and 2009 at Bosque Real Country Club in Mexico City, Mexico.

== Winners ==
Year	Date	Champion	Country	Score	Purse ($)	Winner's share ($)
2009	Mar 22	Pat Hurst	United States	206 (−10)	1,300,000	195,000
2008	Mar 16	Louise Friberg	Sweden	210 (−6)	1,300,000	195,000
2007*	Mar 11	Meaghan Francella	United States	205 (−11)	1,200,000	180,000
2006	Mar 12	Annika Sörenstam	Sweden	208 (−8)	1,200,000	180,000
2005	Mar 6	Annika Sörenstam	Sweden	209 (−7)	1,200,000	180,000

* Championship won in sudden-death playoff.

== Tournament records ==
Year	Player	Score	Round
2009	Lorena Ochoa	65 (−7)	1st
2008	Louise Friberg	65 (−7)	3rd
