= Paul Antony =

American physician

Paul Antony (born 1962) is an Indian-American physician executive and former chief medical officer for the Pharmaceutical Research and Manufacturers of America (PhRMA) . He left PhRMA to serve as CEO of Callidus Biopharma until its acquisition by Amicus Therapeutics (NASDAQ: FOLD) ^{α}

Board-certified in both preventive medicine and aerospace medicine, he received his MD and MPH degrees from the George Washington University. Prior to attending medical school, he earned an MBA from Harvard Business School and worked for McKinsey & Company, where he specialized in post-merger integration within the health care and high technology industries.

Antony is a commander in the United States Navy, Medical Corps. His last active-duty assignment was with the White House Military Office as flight surgeon and senior medical officer for the Marine One Presidential Helicopter Squadron. He continues to serve as a reserve officer and his military experience includes support of Naval Special Warfare and combat & humanitarian deployments to Afghanistan, Iraq, Haiti, & Guantanamo Bay, Cuba.

Antony was a 1993-1994 White House fellow serving in the Executive Office of the President . He received his bachelor of science degree in biomedical engineering from Johns Hopkins University and spent five years developing new products for Hewlett-Packard and AT&T. He now serves as a senior fellow with FasterCures .

== Notes ==
1..
