= Bosque Real Country Club =

Country club in Mexico City, Mexico

Coordinates: 19.422°N 99.286°W

Bosque Real Country Club is a country club near Mexico City, Mexico. Since 2005, it has been the venue for the MasterCard Classic, an annual tournament for professional female golfers on the LPGA Tour.

The Robert von Hagge-designed golf course plays to a par of 72 and is 6901 yards long. Lorena Ochoa and Louise Friberg jointly hold the course record for ladies with 65 (7 under par).

The country club is widely known as the location of the fictional Elite Way School from the Mexican telenovela Rebelde, filmed from 2004 to 2006.
