= Howard R. Elliott =

American government official

Skip Elliott
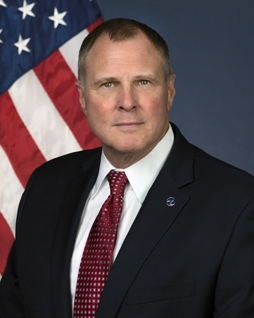

Inspector General for the Department of Transportation Acting
- In office May 16, 2020 – January 11, 2021
- President: Donald Trump
- Preceded by: Mitch Behm (Acting)
- Succeeded by: Eric J. Soskin

5th Administrator of the Pipeline and Hazardous Materials Safety Administration
- In office October 30, 2017 – January 20, 2021
- President: Donald Trump
- Deputy: Drue Pearce
- Preceded by: Marie Dominguez
- Succeeded by: Paul Roberti (2025)

Personal details
- Education: Indiana University, Bloomington (BA); Columbia Southern University (MA)

Howard Robert "Skip" Elliott is an American government official who served as the Administrator of the Pipeline and Hazardous Materials Safety Administration from 2017 to 2021.

From May 2020 to January 2021, Elliott had been Acting Inspector General of the Department of Transportation. His appointment was considered notable for the fact that Elliott was head of an office that was investigating his own actions.

Elliott left both positions on January 20, 2021.

== Education ==
Elliot earned a Bachelor of Arts degree in English and forensic science from Indiana University. He received the first ever Distinguished Alumni Award from Indiana University's Department of Criminal Justice. Elliott is a member of the Indiana University College of Arts and Sciences Executive Dean's Advisory Committee. He later earned a Master's degree from Columbia Southern University.

== Career ==
Prior to assuming his role as Administrator, Elliott had a 40-year career in the U.S. freight rail industry, beginning as a railroad police officer in Elkhart, Indiana. Most recently, he served as vice president of public safety, health, environment and security for CSX Transportation, where he was responsible for hazardous materials transportation safety, homeland security, railroad policing, crisis management, environmental compliance and operations, occupational health management, and continuity of business operations. Elliott has developed and implemented computer-based tools to assist emergency management officials, first responders, and homeland security personnel in preparing for and responding to railroad hazardous materials and security incidents.

Elliott is a recipient of the Association of American Railroads Holden-Proefrock Award for lifetime achievement in hazardous materials transportation safety.
