= Louise Friberg (golfer) =

Swedish professional golfer (born 1980)

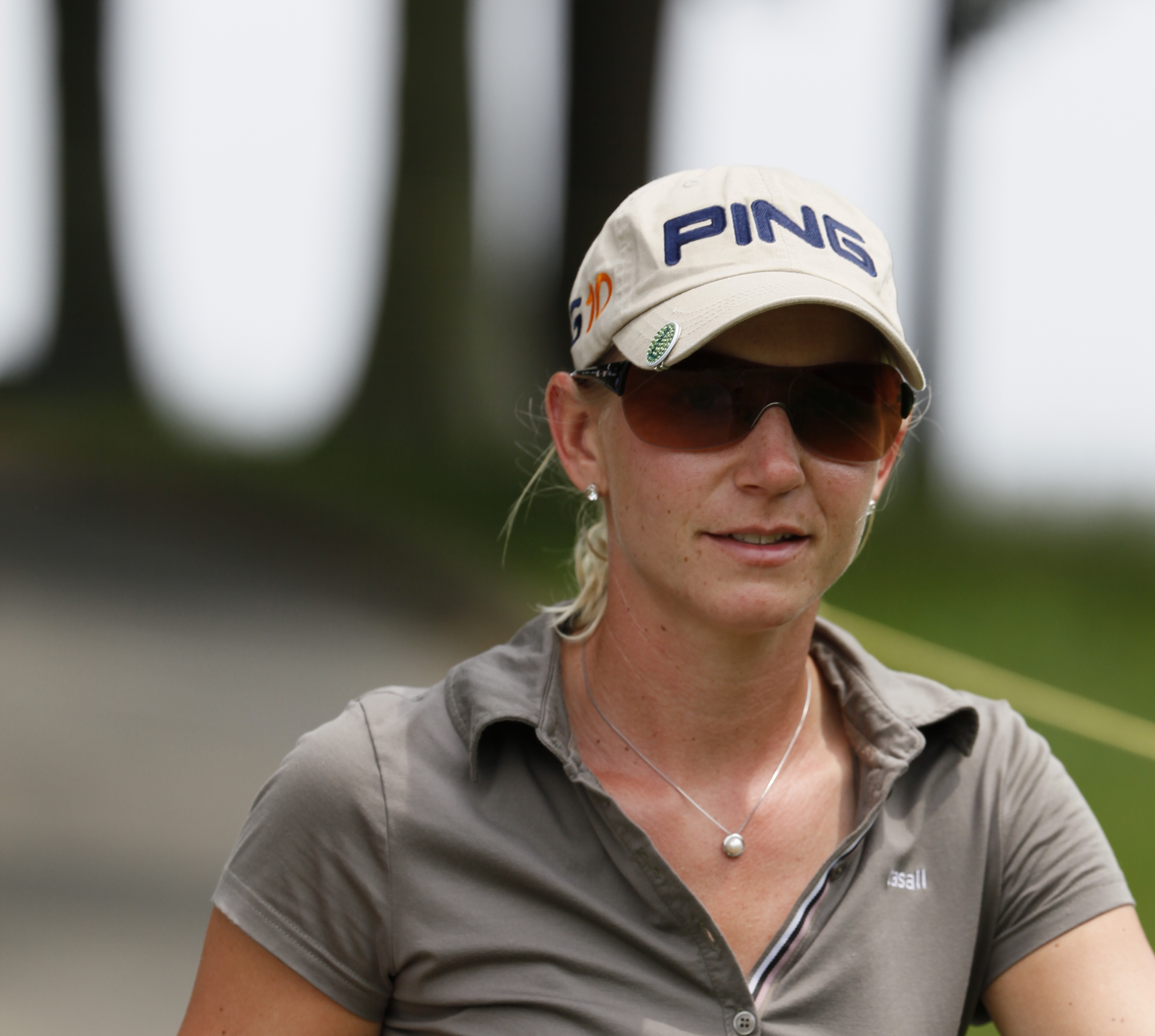
- Friberg at the 2009 LPGA Championship

Personal information
- Full name: Eva Marie Louise Friberg
- Nickname: Lollo
- Nationality: Sweden
- Born: 24 June 1980 (age 46) Helsingborg, Sweden
- Height: 5 ft 5 in (1.65 m)
- Life partner: Ola Nilsson

Career
- Sport: Golf
- College: University of Washington
- Turned professional: 2003
- Former tours: Futures Tour (2004); Telia Tour; Ladies European Tour (2007–11, 2015); LPGA Tour (2008–2011, 2014)
- Professional wins: 3

Number of wins by tour
- LPGA Tour: 1
- Other: 2

Best results in LPGA major championships
- Chevron Championship: T64: 2010
- Women's PGA C'ship: T34: 2008
- U.S. Women's Open: T34: 2009
- Women's British Open: T33: 2007
- Evian Championship: DNP

Louise Friberg (born 24 June 1980) is a Swedish professional golfer. She played on the Ladies European Tour (LET) and the United States–based LPGA Tour.

== Early life ==
Born in a golfing family, Friberg started playing golf at young age at Rya Golf Club, outside Helsingborg, Sweden. Her father Mikael and her grandfather Björn were both elite golfers and each of them held a scratch handicap at the same time in the 1970s. Her grandfather Björn started the Swedish agency for Ping golf equipment, after he coincidentally met Karsten Solheim, when Björn tried to qualify for The Open Championship in England in 1971. Mikael continued to run the business until he retired after 45 years in 2016. Consequently, Friberg kept playing with Ping clubs through her entire career.

Friberg was the 1997 Nordic Youth champion after finishing one-under par over 54 holes at Kalmar Golf Club, Sweden, beating future major winner Suzann Pettersen, Norway, by five strokes.

== Amateur career ==
In 1999, Friberg started college at the University of Washington. She earned a full golf scholarship. Friberg was a standout golfer all four years and graduated with a Bachelor of Arts degree in Environmental Studies in 2003.

In 2002, Friberg finished 9th and best Swedish player at the individual European Ladies Amateur Championship, played at Kristianstad Golf Club, Sweden, nine strokes behind winner Becky Brewerton, Wales.

== Professional career ==
In 2003, Friberg turned professional. She played on the LPGA Futures Tour, then the Swedish Golf Tour, at the time named the Telia Tour, where she won the CA Ladies Trophy at Ullna Golf Club in September 2005.

=== Ladies European Tour ===
Friberg qualified for the Ladies European Tour for 2006. In 2007, she recorded three top-10 finishes on the Ladies European Tour.

She competed at the 2007 Women's British Open, a major tournament on the LPGA Tour, at the Old Course at St Andrews, Scotland, and finished tied for 33rd. It was the first time a women's tournament was allowed at the Old Course.

=== LPGA Tour ===
At the fall 2007 LPGA Qualifying Tournament, she finished tied for 9th, earning fully exempt status on the LPGA Tour for the 2008 season.

In her third start as a tour member, Friberg earned her first LPGA Tour win at the 2008 MasterCard Classic at the Bosque Real Country Club in Mexico City, Mexico, beating runner-up Yani Tseng by one stroke and world number one Lorena Ochoa in 5th place in her home country. In the final round Friberg, shot a 7-under-par 65 to come from ten shots back, despite having been ill through the tournament week. Her MasterCard Classic win is tied for the largest final round comeback in LPGA Tour history. It was also the 100th victory by a Swedish-born player on the LPGA Tour, since Liselotte Neumann won the first at the 1988 U.S. Women's Open.

In November 2010, Friberg lost in a four-player playoff at the Women's Indian Open on the Ladies European Tour, when Laura Davies birdied the first extra hole.

=== Later career ===
On 15 September 2011, Friberg announced she would be retiring from tournament play after competing in the Navistar LPGA Classic, to start a career as a club professional at Vallda Golf & Country Club in Kungsbacka, Sweden. She did play the Kraft Nabisco Championship, from which she was exempt due to her 2008 win, in 2012 and 2013.

After being out of the game for two years running a junior golf program in Sweden and giving private lessons in Arizona, Friberg attempted a comeback and competed in the LPGA Tour's Qualifying School. In 2014 she played 10 tournaments on the LPGA Tour with a best finish of tied 24th at the Manulife Financial LPGA Classic in Waterloo, Ontario, Canada, after a score of 64 in her last round. She also made a visit to her old hometown in Sweden and played the 2014 Helsingborg Open on the Ladies European Tour and finished tied 14th.

During 2015, Friberg only competed in Europe, mainly in Sweden, and won once on the Swedish mini-tour Future Series. After the 2015 season she retired, for the second time, from regular tournament golf and was employed by her old club Rya Golf Club.

== Awards and honors ==
In 2008, she received Elit Sign number 134 by the Swedish Golf Federation based on world ranking achievements.

== Personal life ==
During her LPGA Tour career, she lived in Scottsdale, Arizona. After moving back to Sweden, she settled in Rydebäck, south of Helsingborg. In December 2016, she was appointed sports manager at Rya Golf Club.

== Amateur wins ==
- 1997 Nordic Youth Championship

== Professional wins (3) ==
=== LPGA Tour wins (1) ===
No.	Date	Tournament	Winning score	Margin of victory	Runner-up
1	16 Mar 2008	MasterCard Classic	–6 (72-73-65=210)	1 stroke	(Taiwan) Yani Tseng

=== Other wins (2) ===
- 2005 CA Ladies Trophy (Swedish Golf Tour)
- 2016 Abbekås Open (Swedish Mini Tour Future Series)

== Playoff record ==
Ladies European Tour playoff record (0–1)

No.	Year	Tournament	Opponent	Result
1	2010	Women's Indian Open	(South Africa) Tandi Cuningham (England) Laura Davies (Thailand) Nontaya Srisawang	Davies won with birdie on the first extra hole

== Results in LPGA majors ==
Results not in chronological order before 2014.

Tournament	2007	2008	2009	2010	2011	2012	2013	2014
Kraft Nabisco Championship		CUT	CUT	T64	CUT	CUT	CUT	
U.S. Women's Open		T53	T34	CUT				
Women's British Open	T33	CUT		CUT				
LPGA Championship		T34	CUT	T64	CUT			CUT
The Evian Championship ^								

^ The Evian Championship was added as a major in 2013.

Did not play

CUT = missed the half-way cut
T = tied

== LPGA Tour career summary ==
Year	Events played	Cuts made	Wins	2nds	3rds	Top 10s	Best finish	Earnings ($)	Rank	Scoring average	Scoring rank
2007	1	1	0	0	0	0	T33	14,046	n/a	75.00	n/a
2008	24	16	1	0	0	3	1	395,051	48	72.48	59
2009	21	4	0	0	0	0	T34	34,090	236	74.63	139
2010	17	6	0	0	0	0	T23	47,447	98	73.52	97
2011	7	0	0	0	0	0	MC	0	n/a	76.07	152
2012	1	0	0	0	0	0	MC	0	n/a	76.50	n/a
2013	1	0	0	0	0	0	MC	0	n/a	75.50	n/a
2014	10	3	0	0	0	0	T24	18,904	143	72.69	99

- Official as of 2012 season.
