= Office of Inspector General of the United States Department of Transportation =

- Seal of the Office of Inspector General of the United States Department of Transportation
- Formed: 1978
- Headquarters: Washington, D.C.
- Parent agency: U.S. Department of Transportation
- Inspector General: Mitch Behm (Acting)
- Website: www.oig.dot.gov

The Office of Inspector General of the United States Department of Transportation (DOT-OIG) is the internal oversight office for the United States Department of Transportation. It is charged with monitoring and auditing department programs to combat waste, fraud, and abuse.

The OIG carries out its mission by issuing audit reports, evaluations, and management advisories with findings and recommendations to improve program delivery and performance. In fiscal year 2006, OIG issued 76 audit reports, which identified more than $893 million in financial recommendations.

== History of Inspectors General ==
Inspector General	Date started
Mitch Behm (Acting)	January 24, 2025
Eric J. Soskin	January 11, 2021
Howard R. Elliott (Acting)	May 15, 2020
Mitch Behm (Acting)	February 1, 2020
Calvin L. Scovel III	October 27, 2006
Todd J. Zinser (Acting)	February 11, 2006
Kenneth M. Mead	May 29, 1997
Joyce Fleischman (Acting)	August 12, 1996
Mario A. Lauro, Jr. (Deputy)	July 8, 1996
Mary Schiavo	October 31, 1990
Raymond J. DeCarli (Acting)	January 1, 1990
John W. Melchner	October 12, 1986
Joseph J. Genovese (Acting)	January 1, 1986
Joseph P. Welsch	July 18, 1981
Joseph J. Genovese (Acting)	January 22, 1981
Frank S. Sato	May 10, 1979

== Audit ==
The Office of Auditing and Evaluation supervises and conducts independent and objective audits and other reviews of DOT programs and activities to ensure they operate economically, efficiently, and effectively. This office is divided according to specific DOT program areas into four sub-offices: Aviation; Information Technology and Financial Management; Surface Transportation; and Acquisition and Procurement.

== Leadership ==
In 2006, President George W. Bush appointed U.S. Marine Corps Brigadier General Calvin L. Scovel III, to become the Transportation Department's Inspector General (I.G.) In January 2020, Scovel announced his retirement. In May 2020, President Donald Trump nominated Eric Soskin, a senior trial attorney in the Department of Justice for the last 14 years. He was from Indiana and was selected to replace Scovel. Soskin was confirmed by the Senate in December 2020. Soskin was sworn in as the Inspector General of the U.S. Department of Transportation on January 11, 2021. Trump fired Soskin on January 24, 2025.

== Office of Investigations ==
The Office of Investigations is composed of criminal and general investigators who are responsible for conducting criminal, civil, and administrative investigations of fraud and a variety of other allegations affecting DOT, its operating administrations, programs, and grantees (grant funds). The Office of Investigation's top priorities involve crimes with a public safety impact, procurement and grant fraud schemes that significantly impact DOT funds, consumer and workforce fraud, and employee integrity violations. The Office of Investigations also manages a Hotline Complaint Center and investigates whistleblower complaints, including those referred by the U.S. Office of Special Counsel.
