= La'Shanda Holmes =

Lieutenant Commander La'Shanda Renee Holmes
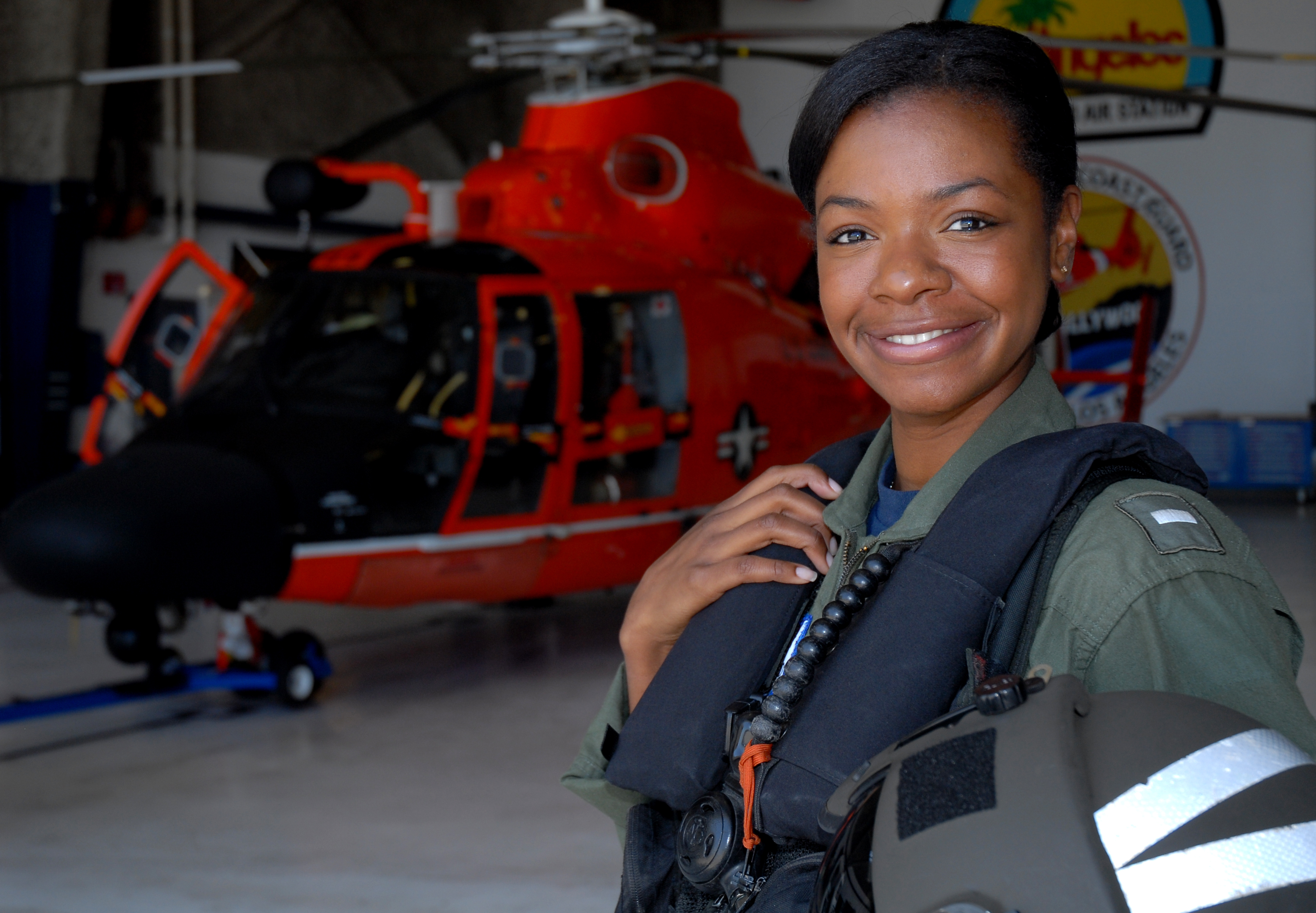
- Holmes in 2010
- Born: 1985 (age 40–41); Plainfield, New Jersey
- Military career
- Branch: United States Coast Guard

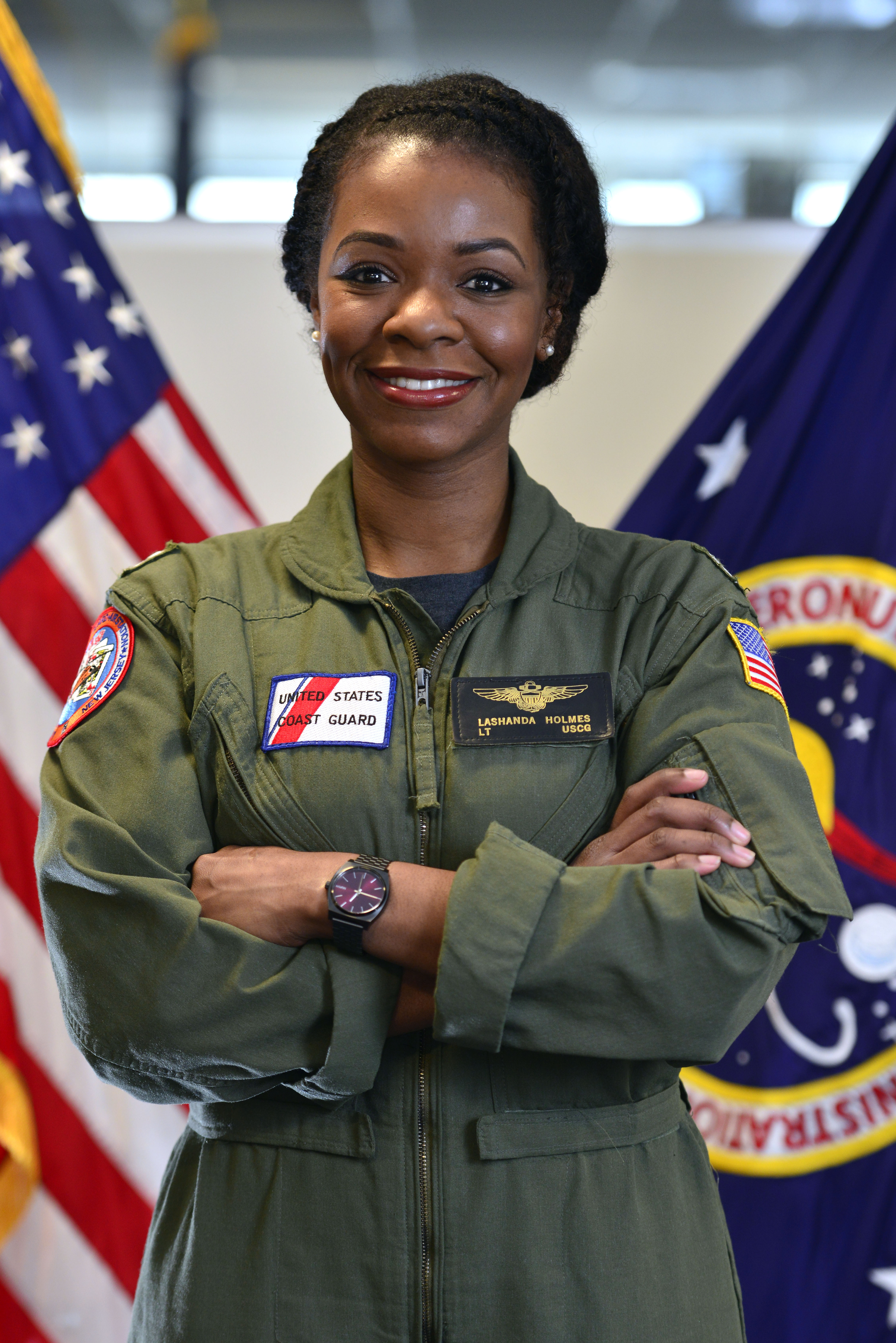
Official Coast Guard photo of Lt. La’Shanda Holmes, the Coast Guard's first African American female helicopter pilot, and a 2015 White House Fellow (assigned to NASA). Coast Guard

La'Shanda R. Holmes is a lieutenant commander in the United States Coast Guard and the first African-American female helicopter pilot for the Coast Guard. She grew up in the foster care system and put herself through Spelman College. She was an Aircraft Commander at Air Station Los Angeles, Air Station Atlantic City (where she was deployed multiple times to Washington D.C. (NCR) as a rotary wing air intercept pilot), and Air Station Miami. She has amassed over 2,000 flight hours conducting search and rescue, counter drug, law enforcement, and Presidential air-intercept missions. She was appointed as a White House Fellow in 2015 by President Barack Obama. In 2015–2016 she was the Special Assistant to the NASA Administrator General Charles F. Bolden.

Holmes received her BA in psychology from Spelman College and is a Bonner Scholar. She sits on the board of directors for Tomorrow's Aeronautical Museum, Foster Club, and Girls Fly!
