= Margarita Colmenares =

American environmental engineer

- Born: July 20, 1957
- Alma mater: Stanford University; Stanford University School of Engineering; Sacramento City College
- Awards: White House Fellows (1991)

Margarita Hortensia Colmenares (born July 20, 1957) is an American environmental engineer and activist for the Hispanic-American community. In 1989 she became the first woman to serve as President of the Society of Hispanic Professional Engineers.

== Early life and education ==
Colmenares grew up in Sacramento, California, the oldest of five children born to Luis and Hortensia Colmenares, Mexican immigrants who worked as laborers. She attended private Catholic schools in her childhood, and began her tertiary education at California State University, Sacramento with the intent to earn a degree in business. However, she became interested in engineering and ultimately earned her bachelor's degree in civil engineering from Stanford University in 1981. She also performed traditional Mexican dance at university. She was co-director of the Ballet Folklórico de Stanford University.

== Career ==
While in school, Colmenares worked for Xerox, Chevron, and the California Department of Water Resources. Upon graduation from Stanford, Colmenares continued a career with Chevron, starting as a field construction engineer and later working in Colorado and Texas before returning to California to head a major environmental cleanup at the Chevron El Segundo plant. She earned a White House fellowship in 1991, the first Hispanic engineer to be selected. She spent her term at the White House working in the Department of Education, where she returned in 1996 as its director of corporate liaison. Through her leadership roles, she has advocated for Hispanic-American and women engineers. She founded the San Francisco chapter of the Society of Hispanic Professional Engineers.

== Honors and awards ==
- White House fellowship (1991)
- President, Society of Hispanic Professional Engineers (1989)
- Pioneer Award, Hispanic Engineer (1991)
- Community Service Award, Hispanic Engineer (1989)
- National Hispana Leadership Initiative (1989)
- Outstanding Hispanic Woman of the Year, Hispanic magazine (1989)
- 100 Most Influential Hispanics, Hispanic Business (1990, 1992)
- Outstanding Alumni Award, California Community College League
