= Alabama Commission on Higher Education =

Agency of the U.S. state of Alabama

The Alabama Commission on Higher Education, a statewide 12-member lay board appointed by the Governor of Alabama, Lieutenant Governor, and Speaker of the House and confirmed by the Senate, is the state agency responsible for the overall statewide planning and coordination of higher education in Alabama, the administration of various student aid programs, and the performance of designated regulatory functions. The Commission seeks to provide reasonable access to quality collegiate and university education for the citizens of Alabama. In meeting this commitment, the Commission facilitates informed decision making and policy formulation regarding wise stewardship of resources in response to the needs of students and the goals of institutions. The agency also provides a state-level framework for institutions to respond cooperatively and individually to the needs of the citizens of the State.

The planning/coordination/designated regulatory functions of the Commission are limited to public sector institutions.

== Alabama Mosaic ==
Under the umbrella of the commission is the Network of Alabama Academic Libraries, an academic consortium. It administers Alabama Mosaic, a publicly accessible "repository of digital materials on Alabama's history, culture, places, and people."
