= Mary Schiavo =

American whistleblower, lawyer and former Inspector General of the USDOT

Inspector General of the Department of Transportation
- In office October 31, 1990 – July 8, 1996
- President: George H. W. Bush; Bill Clinton
- Preceded by: Raymond DeCarli (Acting)
- Succeeded by: Mario Lauro (Acting)

Personal details
- Education: Ohio State University, Columbus; Harvard University (BA); New York University (JD)

Mary Fackler Schiavo (pronounced [ˈskjaːvo]) is an American lawyer. She was the Inspector General of the United States Department of Transportation (DOT) from 1990 to 1996. In 1997, Schiavo wrote Flying Blind, Flying Safe, which was critical of the Federal Aviation Administration.

In 1987 and 1988, Schiavo, then known as Mary Sterling, served as a White House Fellow and handled Foreign Intelligence Surveillance Act (FISA) requests as a special assistant to then US Attorney General Edwin Meese. From 1989 to 1990, she served at the United States Department of Labor as Assistant Secretary of Labor for Labor Management Standards. She criticized the work of the 9/11 Commission and ValuJet's safety record.

Schiavo has represented air-crash survivors and appeared on investigative programs such as Frontline.

== Education ==
Schiavo graduated from Harvard University and New York University.

== USDOT career ==
In 1990, President of the United States George H. W. Bush appointed Schiavo as the Inspector General of the U.S. Department of Transportation. She began campaigns to eliminate unapproved aircraft parts. By 1996, the investigations under Schiavo led to more than 150 criminal convictions and over US$47 million in restitutions and fines. The resulting prison sentences from the convictions ranged up to five years per person.

== Flying Blind ==
In 1997, after leaving her post at the DOT, Schiavo wrote Flying Blind, Flying Safe, a criticism of the aviation industry and the Federal Aviation Administration.

In Flying Blind, Schiavo describes how the FAA uses a formula ascribing specific monetary value to human lives, and how the agency allows numbers to decide whether the cost of extra safety is worth the additional expense. Schiavo is similarly critical of the internal FAA politics and the FAA's administrators.

After the Secretary of Transportation said that ValuJet was safe, Schiavo produced contrary evidence from government files. In the book's analysis of the ValuJet Flight 592 crash, Schiavo argued that the FAA had to have known ValuJet was unsafe. She believed the FAA wanted ValuJet to survive, leading it to take a lax view of overseeing and enforcing rules.

== Ohio State University ==
In 1997, Schiavo was selected to receive the Outstanding Alumnus Award.

During the 1997–98 academic year, Schiavo was a visiting professor, teaching a required graduate administrative law class in the university's Master of Public Policy program, now the John Glenn School of Public Affairs. After completing the professor in residence appointment in Public Policy, she accepted the McConnell Aviation Chair, teaching from 1998 to 2002.

== Columbus bomb scare ==
In 1999, Schiavo was responsible for a bomb scare that partially shut down the Port Columbus International Airport in Columbus, Ohio for four hours. A bag was checked in her name for a flight, but she did not board the plane. When inspected in an X-ray machine, the luggage contained what appeared to be a bomb, but upon further inspection, the bag contained a disassembled bomb with no explosives inside. Schiavo was at the airport at the time of the discovery with a film crew from a local TV station. No criminal charges were filed against her for the incident.

== September 11 attacks ==
Schiavo contends that FAA officials refused to believe the US faced a threat of domestic terrorism prior to the September 11 attacks. She has represented many of the families who have sued the U.S. airlines involved in the 9/11 terrorist attacks.

Schiavo criticized the way the 9/11 commission disclosed information given to it during the several hearings. The New York Observer reported: "Ms. Schiavo sat in on the commission's hearing on aviation security on 9/11 and was disgusted by what it left out". She said that "In any other situation, it would be unthinkable to withhold investigative material from an independent commission. There are usually grave consequences. But the commission is clearly not talking to everybody or not telling us everything."
