= Louis O'Neill (diplomat) =

American diplomat and attorney

Louis F. O’Neill is an American diplomat and attorney. An expert on Russia/Eurasia conflicts and security, he served as Organization for Security and Co-operation in Europe Ambassador and Head of Mission to Moldova (2006–2008). O’Neill worked on the State Department's Policy Planning Staff (2005–2006), and as Special Assistant for Russian Affairs to Secretary of State Colin Powell (2004–2005) when O’Neill was a non-political, non-partisan White House Fellow.

Before his diplomatic service, O’Neill served under Manhattan District Attorney Robert Morgenthau as an Assistant District Attorney in the Special Prosecutions Bureau. After law school, he worked in the private sector as an attorney for White & Case, LLP and as General Counsel and Head of Business Development for an investment/venture capital fund in New York City.

== Background and education ==
Louis O’Neill attended Hunter College High School in Manhattan and earned a bachelor's degree with Distinction from Stanford University, where he was Co-Captain of the Stanford Cycling Team, leading it to 3rd place in National Competition. Later he completed a master's degree at Stanford's Center for Russian and East European Studies and graduated cum laude from the Harvard Law School.

== Private sector work ==
Louis O’Neill joined the law firm of White & Case in 1997 and worked in the Litigation and Corporate Departments. His extensive pro bono work on behalf of New York's indigent earned him the Legal Aid Society's Pro Bono Award in 2000. He also served as General Counsel and Head of Business Development for The Falconwood Corporation, an investment/venture capital fund in New York City. O'Neill is currently Counsel at White & Case.

== Assistant District Attorney ==
In April 2001, O’Neill joined the New York County District Attorney's Office as an Assistant District Attorney in the Special Prosecutions Bureau. He investigated and prosecuted numerous cases of white-collar and organized crime, frauds and scams. His most widely reported case involved a ring of women who would, for money, repeatedly marry foreign-born men to facilitate immigration fraud. One woman married 27 times in this way.

Another important case resulted in the take-down of an organized crime ring whose bankruptcy and auctioneering fraud resulted in at least $27.7 million in thefts from distressed businesses that were being restructured or liquidated. O’Neill also investigated an explosion in a Chelsea manufacturing plant that injured dozens of people and closed West 21st Street. This case led to enhanced safety compliance in the industry. Louis O’Neill specialized in tracking down elusive white-collar criminals on the lam, and brought number of them back to the United States to face prosecution, including a German man who defrauded hundreds of hotel patrons and a Russian man who ran a fraudulent immigration law firm.

Following the 2001 terrorist attack on the World Trade Center, the Special Prosecutions Bureau investigated and prosecuted nearly 200 cases of "electronic looting" against New York's Municipal Credit Union. Each defendant stole at least $7,500 from the bank in the chaos following the attacks. O’Neill handled two dozen of these cases. He also handled smaller, highly emotional cases where vulnerable, elderly or mentally incapacitated victims were preyed upon for their money.

== White House Fellow ==
In 2004, Louis O’Neill was selected to the 2004–2005 class of White House Fellows. He was assigned to the State Department as Secretary of State Colin Powell's Special Assistant on Russian Affairs. He covered issues of counter-terrorism and counter-narcotics cooperation and also was tasked with special projects, including as the U.S. Expert for the OSCE Fact-Finding Mission to the Occupied Territories Surrounding Nagorno-Karabakh, whose report he co-authored.

== Policy Planning Staff ==
Upon completion of the White House Fellowship, O’Neill was asked to stay on at the US State Department in a non-political capacity as a member of the Policy Planning Staff, covering Russia, Ukraine, Belarus, Moldova and the countries of the Caucasus.

== OSCE Ambassador and Head of Mission to Moldova ==
In 2006, O’Neill was confirmed by the Belgian Chairman-in-Office of the Organization for Security and Co-operation in Europe as OSCE Ambassador and Head of Mission to Moldova. The OSCE Mission to Moldova's Mandate calls for facilitating the achievement of a lasting, comprehensive political settlement of the Transnistria conflict in all its aspects, as well as advancing human and minority rights, democratic transformation, freedom of the press and fighting the scourge of human trafficking. It also requires ensuring transparency of the removal and destruction of Russian ammunition and armaments from Moldova.

O’Neill pushed hard for fulfillment of this Mandate – which was approved by all OSCE participating States – and for reconciliation of the Moldovan and Transnistrian sides. He brought them together in a seminar on Confidence and Security Building measures in October 2007, on the margins of which the 5+2 negotiating format (OSCE, Russia, Ukraine, EU, US, Moldova and Transnistria) met for the first time in some 18 months. O’Neill did much to encourage the sides to disarm, including providing financial aid for the destruction of surplus weapons, and organizing seminars on proper storage and stockpile management.

His efforts to improve Moldova's human rights landscape and make it more attractive to the Transnistrian separatists included enhancing press freedoms, defending the rights of opposition parties, improving anti-torture legislation, strengthening the rule of law and judiciary, protecting freedom of assembly, and guarding the linguistic rights of schoolchildren in Transnistria.

O’Neill devoted significant attention to improving elections throughout Moldova. This included marshaling the Chişinău diplomatic core to actively monitor the Gagauz Bashkan election in December 2006 and running an observation mission there, . He also played an active role in covering the Moldovan national local elections in June 2007, helping de-escalate a violent situation at a Moldovan polling place on the left bank of the Nistru.

O’Neill also placed a priority on battling gender violence and human trafficking, very serious problems in Moldova.

O'Neill used creative approaches to bring the Moldovan and Transnistrian sides together. These included a very popular rock festival on the Nistru river with bands from both sides, and a photo contest.

== Work for the Obama campaign ==
From January 2008 O’Neill worked for Barack Obama's campaign, serving in five states during the primaries – New York, Ohio, Pennsylvania, North Carolina and Montana in a variety of capacities. During the general election he assisted the state leadership in Virginia and was involved in all aspects of that race. As well, O’Neill was one of the Obama campaign's foreign policy advisors as part of the Russia/Eurasia team.

== Other information ==
Louis O’Neill is a native English speaker and speaks fluent Russian and Romanian. He was a Presidential Fulbright Scholar to the USSR in 1990–1991 and was awarded Foreign Language Area Studies (FLAS) grants at Stanford and Harvard for the advanced study of Russian. He gave numerous speeches while OSCE Ambassador in Moldova, with representative examples here.
