= Ronald Motley =

American lawyer

Ron Motley
- Born: October 21, 1944; North Charleston, South Carolina, U.S.
- Died: August 22, 2013 (aged 68); Charleston, South Carolina, U.S.
- Education: University of South Carolina School of Law
- Occupation: Lawyer

Ronald L. Motley (October 21, 1944 – August 22, 2013) was an American trial attorney and a principal of Motley Rice LLC–a law firm based in Mount Pleasant, South Carolina. He is best known for leading lawsuits against tobacco and asbestos companies.

== Early life and education ==
Motley grew up in North Charleston, South Carolina, where his father owned an Amoco gas station. He graduated from the University of South Carolina School of Law in 1971.

== Career ==
Motley was lead counsel for more than 6,500 family members and survivors of the September 11 attacks seeking justice against al-Qaeda's financiers.

Motley won major judgments for his clients against the asbestos and tobacco industries. Motley was portrayed by Bruce McGill in the 1999 film The Insider, starring Russell Crowe.

== Death ==
Motley died on August 22, 2013, after a prolonged illness. The cause of death was described by one colleague as "respiratory complications" and by another as "complications from organ failure".
