= Carolyn Bivens =

American golf administrator

Commissioner of the LPGA
- In office 2005 – 13 July 2009
- Preceded by: Ty Votaw
- Succeeded by: Michael Whan

Personal details
- Born: December 29, 1952 (age 73) Oklahoma City, Oklahoma, U.S.
- Occupation: Business executive, golf administrator

Carolyn Bivens (born December 29, 1952, in Oklahoma City, Oklahoma) was the commissioner of the LPGA from 2005 until her resignation on July 13, 2009. She was the seventh person and the first woman to hold the position of commissioner since the LPGA was founded in 1950.

Bivens was previously president and chief operating officer of Initiative Media North America, the largest media services agency in the United States and part of the Interpublic Group of Companies. She also worked at USA Today, where she led the worldwide advertising operations for USA Today and USA Today’s international edition. In 2002, Electronic Media magazine named Bivens one of the most powerful women in television.

== LPGA Commissioner ==
Bivens was commissioner of the LPGA from late 2005 until her resignation in July 2009. The LPGA commissioner is chief executive and administrative officer of the LPGA and is responsible for its day-to-day operations. The LPGA committee selected Bivens on the basis of her media and sales experience, with the intention of capitalizing on the brand value of the LPGA's deepening talent pool. At the time of her hire, the LPGA was experiencing an unprecedented influx of new potential superstars, many of whom fell into demographics new to the traditional LPGA audience. Bivens's strategy has been described by several writers as an attempt to re-align the business model of the LPGA with that of other professional sports organizations. Primary objectives of the plan included increasing tournament purse sizes, establishing greater control over event venues and LPGA-associated media rights, and the provision of viable pension and health care plans.

== Changes instituted at LPGA during Bivens' tenure ==
=== Introduction of drug testing ===
In 2006, Bivens announced the first formal drug testing program in professional golf. The program was introduced in the 2008 season.

=== Media credential policy change ===
At the second tournament of 2006, The Fields Open in Hawaii, the LPGA reached a stalemate with certain members of the press while negotiating media rights. Two Honolulu newspapers, the Associated Press, Sports Illustrated, Golf World and other unnamed publications refused to cover the first round of the tournament. Golf World continued to withhold coverage of the event for two subsequent rounds, before returning after reaching an agreement with the LPGA. Details of the dispute were never released by either side, despite frequent references to the dispute by the press. A year later, the LPGA made its media rights credential available to the public at LPGAMediaCredential.com.

=== Acquisition of Duramed Futures Tour ===
In July 2007, the LPGA acquired the Duramed Futures Tour, incorporating it more closely with the LPGA and formally making it the official development tour of the LPGA.

=== International player on LPGA Board of Directors ===
In 2008, the LPGA constitution was amended to require the inclusion of an international player on the board of directors.

=== Television programming ===
In February 2009, Bivens unveiled two major television rights deals. On the domestic front, the LPGA agreed to a 10-year partnership with cable network Golf Channel, making it the exclusive home of the LPGA Tour. Internationally, the LPGA and JoongAng Broadcasting Corporation (JBC) agreed to a five-year partnership that names J Golf the LPGA's official Korean media rights partner starting in 2010. JBC also will underwrite an event in the greater Los Angeles area on the 2010-2014 LPGA Tour schedules. J Golf's overall media rights investment in the LPGA over five years is the largest in LPGA history.

=== Proposed use of Twitter ===
On May 28, 2009, Bivens is purported to have said in an interview that she would, "love it if players Twittered during the middle of a round." Bloomberg removed the original interview without explanation, making it impossible to contextualize the remark, or to objectively evaluate the merits of the criticisms which followed. The article put in the place of the original interview focuses upon the reactions of two highly ranked players, Paula Creamer and Morgan Pressel, who used Twitter itself to inform their fans that they would not be tweeting while on the green. On June 5, 2009, eight days after Bivens's original statement in the media, Bivens commented on the LPGA website that her remarks had been taken out of context, emphasizing that players would not be tweeting during rounds.

== Resignation as Commissioner of LPGA ==
In early July 2009, the Board of Directors of the LPGA received a letter from a group of top players on the Tour calling for Bivens' resignation with two years remaining in her contract. The overriding cause of the complaint had been Bivens' insistence that all Tour players become English-proficient. Bivens had proposed the change as being out of a concern for the foreign-speaking players' welfare: "If these players don't take this step [and learn English], their ability to earn a living is reduced. They will be cut out of corporate and endorsement opportunities. I can't imagine that someone who has thought this through does not realize that in opposing this measure they are penalizing the very people they are trying to help." (ESPN Golf, Sep 1, 2008). This insistence drew a strong public backlash from foreign and domestic Tour players alike. The letter followed the announcement that several long-time tournaments would not be returning in 2010 and amidst complaints from tournament directors that Bivens's management style and approach was counterproductive. In the letter it was stated that "the majority" of LPGA members supported the request for resignation. On July 13, 2009, Bivens officially resigned and an acting commissioner was named while a search for a new commissioner was undertaken.
