= Flying Blind, Flying Safe =

1997 non-fiction book

- Front cover
- Author: Mary Schiavo, with Sabra Chartrand
- Language: English
- Subject: United States Department of Transportation, Federal Aviation Administration
- Genre: Non-fiction
- Publisher: Avon Books
- Publication date: March 1997
- Publication place: United States
- Media type: Hardcover
- Pages: 303
- ISBN: 0-380-97532-7
- OCLC: 0380975327

Flying Blind, Flying Safe is a non-fiction book about the American airline industry and Federal Aviation Administration, written by former Inspector General of the United States Department of Transportation, Mary Schiavo, with New York Times journalist Sabra Chartrand. The book was first published in March 1997 in hardcover format by Avon Books. An updated paperback edition was published on April 1, 1998. Schiavo was Inspector General of the United States Department of Transportation for six years, and resigned in 1996 shortly after the ValuJet Flight 592 airline crash in the Florida Everglades which killed all 110 people on board. She became a whistleblower and was highly critical of the airline industry and its relationship with aviation safety agencies in the United States federal government.

The book is structured into two sections. The first portion of the book is critical of the aviation industry and the U.S. government agencies tasked with inspecting it. The second portion of the book addresses consumers and potential airline passengers.

The book became successful shortly after publication. It reached number 10 on the New York Times Best Seller list and number 9 on a Chicago Tribune list of bestsellers in early April 1997. Most reviews of the book in media publications were positive. Some individuals within the airline industry claimed the book contained factual inaccuracies; this was investigated as part of a class project at George Washington University.

== Authors ==
Mary Schiavo was raised in Williams County, Ohio, and received her pilot's license while studying in her first two years of college at Ohio State University (OSU). She obtained a bachelor's degree from Harvard University, and a master's degree in public administration from OSU. She has a law degree from New York University, and has worked as a federal prosecutor. Schiavo served as Inspector General of the United States Department of Transportation from 1990 to July 1996.

Schiavo resigned from her position at the U.S. Department of Transportation in order to blow the whistle on what she saw as deficiencies in safety practices by the federal government's oversight of the airline industry. She was publicly critical of high-ranking U.S. aviation officials regarding the ValuJet Flight 592 passenger jet crash in the Florida Everglades which resulted in the deaths of all 110 people aboard. Schiavo appeared on ABC's Nightline program the night after the crash and was highly critical of FAA safety inspections methods. After resigning her position as Inspector General, Schiavo taught courses at OSU, and in April 1997 she joined the staff of OSU in the position of Enarson Executive-in-Residence.

Co-writer Sabra Chartrand graduated from the University of Washington, and reported for Reuters and Israel Radio in Tel Aviv, Israel. She later joined The New York Times as a journalist with their Jerusalem bureau. While in Israel, she met fellow journalist Joel Brinkley, to whom she was married from 1990 until his death in 2014. After Flying Blind, Flying Safe, she co-authored former securities trader Joseph Jett's memoir, Black And White on Wall Street: The Untold Story of the Man Wrongly Accused of Bringing Down Kidder Peabody, in 1999.

== Contents ==
The first portion of the book is a critique of deficiencies in safety practices by the Federal Aviation Administration and United States Department of Transportation, and the inherent problems with the closeness between these agencies and the airline industry. The book is an exposé of what Schiavo saw as fraud, corruption, waste, mismanagement, and dangerous negligence in the aviation industry and the FAA as a crusader for flight safety. Her primary criticisms in the book focus on the FAA's reluctance to address its many shortcomings, while expressing her concern that there was a fundamental conflict of interest between the FAA job of oversight and the FAA job of promoting aviation.

Schiavo describes how the FAA uses a formula ascribing specific monetary value to human lives, and how the agency allows numbers to decide whether the cost of extra safety is worth the additional expense. For example, if equipping an airline fleet with smoke detectors would cost $100 million, but would only save 10 lives each worth $1 million, then the expense is ruled out. Schiavo is similarly critical of the internal FAA politics and the FAA's administrators.

The last 145 pages of the book is addressed to passengers, to help them determine which airlines have good safety records and how to better ensure safe travel while flying. Schiavo discusses the average ages of certain airline fleets, reveals the accident rates of the major airline carriers, safety ratings at national airlines, bomb detection rates at U.S. airports, and provides a list of airports where power failures have affected the effectiveness of control towers. She concludes with a list of recommendations for how individuals can effect change at government agencies including the FAA, and how to address concerns of conflict of interest between air safety and inspection and the airline industry.

== Reception ==
Flying Blind, Flying Safe reached number 10 on the New York Times Best Seller list on April 6, 1997, and remained on the list through June 1997. On April 13, 1997, the book was ranked 9th on the Chicago Tribune list of bestsellers for hardback non-fiction.

Christina Del Valle reviewed the book for BusinessWeek, and wrote: "Flying Blind, Flying Safe is an incisive primer on what ails the aviation industry and the feds' regulation of it". A subsequent article in BusinessWeek highlighted the book among "The Best Business Books of 1997". In a review in The Washington Post, Judy Mann called the book "a scathing -- and frightening -- indictment of the FAA, the multibillion-dollar airline industry and its lapdogs in Congress". James T. Yenckel of The Washington Post called the book "frightening" and "informative", and wrote that "passengers should have this kind of safety information when choosing a flight." In a review for The Virginian-Pilot, Michael Anft wrote: "She may be to the airplane what Ralph Nader was to the automobile." Bill Wallace gave the book a favorable review in the San Francisco Chronicle, and wrote: "Part memoir, part exposé, her book gives an inside view of how the FAA does its job of regulating air travel -- and how it frequently fails." R.J. Ignelzi gave the book a positive recommendation in a review for The San Diego Union-Tribune, and commented: "Mary Schiavo's candid evaluation of the Federal Aviation Administration, airport security and air traffic controllers will give even the occasional flier some apprehension. Still, it should be read."

Carl Marbach of AVweb wrote positively of the first portion of the book, but was critical of the latter half: "On the whole, the book has some worthwhile sections notwithstanding the soap opera ramblings at the end. Read the first half, then pass it along to another pilot-friend." John Clark of The Plain Dealer gave the book a positive review, but was also critical of the instructive section at the end of the book: "Narratively, the book breaks down when Schiavo resorts to lists and tables to provide information to help the reader fly more safely." Robert W. Poole Jr. reviewed the book for Reason, and called it "valuable and frustrating". Poole noted "Only an outsider-insider like Schiavo could provide ordinary people with authentic accounts of how badly off-track the FAA has gotten in its job of looking after aviation safety," but commented that some aviation veterans regarded her as a "loose cannon". Jerry Fraser of The Boston Globe was critical in his review of the book, and wrote that "a book that sets out to be 'everything you need to know to travel safer by air' winds up griping about how the FAA reimburses employees for moving expenses and conducts crude management-training seminars". The book received a critical review from Bill Adair in the St. Petersburg Times, who wrote: "Schiavo is right about many problems at the FAA. ... But Schiavo seems unable to offer a calm and constructive account of the FAA's problems. She'd rather grab headlines with wild and often inaccurate comments."

Many in the airline industry were critical of the book, and asserted that it contained factual inaccuracies. In 1998, Instructor Darryl Jenkins of George Washington University decided to assign a class project in a graduate course he was teaching on airline economics for students to fact-check statements made by Schiavo in the book. Edmund Pinto, a former Federal Aviation Administration spokesman and publisher of the newsletter Aviation Daily, later co-authored a report with Jenkins on their findings. In some instances the authors agreed with Schiavo's conclusions, but argued that what they saw as discrepancies detracted from Schiavo's position. In response Schiavo commented that the report by Jenkins and Pinto was "hardly the sort of unbiased reporting which warrants my response", and an article on the matter in The Washington Post noted that: "Jenkins occasionally does economic consulting work for airlines and for airline unions, but he said he took on the book project on his own."

== See also ==
- Air safety
