= List of After Words interviews first aired in 2018 =

After Words is an American television series on the C-SPAN2 network’s weekend programming schedule known as Book TV. The program is an hour-long talk show, each week featuring an interview with the author of a new non-fiction book. The program has no regular host. Instead, each author is paired with a guest host who is familiar with the author or the subject matter of their book.

| First air date (Links to video) | Interviewee(s) | Interviewer(s) | Book | Topic of interview / Comments |
|---|---|---|---|---|
| January 6, 2018 | Jon Newman | Richard Blumenthal | Benched: Abortion, Terrorists, Drones, Crooks, Supreme Court, Kennedy, Nixon, Demi Moore, and Other Tales from the Life of a Federal Judge | |
| January 13, 2018 | Peter Edelman | Hank Johnson | Not a Crime to Be Poor | |
| January 20, 2018 | Linda Sarsour | Heather McGhee | Together We Rise | |
| January 27, 2018 | Kayleigh McEnany | Matt Lewis | The New American Revolution: The Making of a Populist Movement | |
| February 3, 2018 | David Frum | Carlos Lozada | Trumpocracy: The Corruption of the American Republic | Presidency of Donald Trump |
| February 10, 2018 | Patrisse Khan-Cullors | Touré | When They Call You a Terrorist: A Black Lives Matter Memoir | |
| February 17, 2018 | Ira Shapiro | Tom Daschle | Broken: Can the Senate Save Itself and the Country? | |
| February 24, 2018 | Tara Westover | Susannah Cahalan | Educated: A Memoir | |
| March 3, 2018 | Joanne Lipman | Leonard Lance | That's What She Said | |
| March 17, 2018 | Bryan Caplan | Scott Carlson | The Case Against Education | |
| March 24, 2018 | Sarah McBride | Vanita Gupta | Tomorrow Will Be Different: Love, Loss, and the Fight for Trans Equality | |
| March 31, 2018 | James Swanson | Jesse Holland | Chasing King's Killer: The Hunt for Martin Luther King, Jr.'s Assassin | Assassination of Martin Luther King Jr., James Earl Ray |
| April 7, 2018 | Tim Scott and Trey Gowdy | Jim DeMint | Unified: How Our Unlikely Friendship Gives Us Hope for a Divided Country | |
| April 14, 2018 | David Corn and Michael Isikoff | Joaquin Castro | Russian Roulette: The Inside Story of Putin's War on America and the Election of Donald Trump | Russian interference in the 2016 United States elections |
| April 28, 2018 | Ron Kessler | Ginni Thomas | The Trump White House: Changing the Rules of the Game | |
| May 5, 2018 | Chris Hughes | Don Beyer | Fair Shot: Rethinking Inequality and How We Earn | |
| May 12, 2018 | Jerome Corsi | Sharyl Attkisson | Killing the Deep State: The Fight to Save President Trump | |
| May 19, 2018 | Barbara Ehrenreich | Natalie Angier | Natural Causes: An Epidemic of Wellness, the Certainty of Dying, and Killing Ourselves to Live Longer | |
| May 26, 2018 | James Clapper | Jim Himes | Facts and Fears: Hard Truths from a Life in Intelligence | |
| June 2, 2018 | Jonah Goldberg | John Podhoretz | Suicide of the West: How the Rebirth of Tribalism, Populism, Nationalism, and Identity Politics is Destroying American Democracy | |
| June 16, 2018 | Bill Press | Mona Charen | From the Left: A Life in the Crossfire | |
| June 23, 2018 | John Delaney | Donna Brazile | | |
| June 30, 2018 | Mona Hanna-Attisha | Gary Peters | What the Eyes Don't See | Flint water crisis |
| July 7, 2018 | Mohammed Al Samawi | Julie Zauzmer | The Fox Hunt: A Refugee's Memoir of Coming to America | |
| July 14, 2018 | Amanda Carpenter | S. E. Cupp | Gaslighting America: Why We Love It When Trump Lies to Us | |
| July 21, 2018 | Mark Adams | Libby Casey | Tip of the Iceberg: My 3,000-Mile Journey Around Wild Alaska, the Last Great American Frontier | Harriman Alaska expedition |
| July 28, 2018 | Sean Spicer | Michael Steele | The Briefing: Politics, the Press, and the President | |
| August 4, 2018 | Malcolm Nance | Suzanne Spaulding | The Plot to Destroy Democracy | |
| August 11, 2018 | D.L. Hughley | Hakeem Jeffries | How Not to Get Shot: And Other Advice From White People | |
| August 17, 2018 | Kate Germano | Todd South | Fight Like a Girl: The Truth Behind How Female Marines Are Trained | |
| August 24, 2018 | Dambisa Moyo | Jason Furman | Edge of Chaos: Why Democracy Is Failing to Deliver Economic Growth - and How to Fix It | |
| September 8, 2018 | Arne Duncan | Kaya Henderson | How Schools Work | |
| September 15, 2018 | Derek Hunter | Brent Bozell | Outrage, Inc.: How the Liberal Mob Ruined Science, Journalism, and Hollywood | |
| September 22, 2018 | John Kerry | Jane Harman | Every Day Is Extra | |
| September 29, 2018 | Carol Anderson | Jamie Raskin | One Person, No Vote: How Voter Suppression Is Destroying Our Democracy | Shelby v. Holder |
| October 6, 2018 | Rebecca Traister | Brittany Cooper | Good and Mad: The Revolutionary Power of Women's Anger | |
| October 13, 2018 | Gina Loudon | Louie Gohmert | Mad Politics: Keeping Your Sanity in a World Gone Crazy | |
| October 20, 2018 | Beth Macy | Gerald Connolly | Dopesick: Dealers, Doctors, and the Drug Company that Addicted America | |
| October 27, 2018 | | | | |
| November 3, 2018 | Charlotte Pence | Kate Brower | Where You Go: Life Lessons From My Father | |
| November 10, 2018 | Ben Sasse | Arthur C. Brooks | Them: Why We Hate Each Other - and How to Heal | |
| November 17, 2018 | | | | |
| November 24, 2018 | Jose Antonio Vargas | Rinku Sen | Dear America: Notes of an Undocumented Citizen | |
| December 1, 2018 | Reihan Salam | Doris Meissner | Melting Pot or Civil War?: A Son of Immigrants Makes the Case Against Open Borders | |
| December 8, 2018 | | | | |
| December 15, 2018 | David Bossie and Corey Lewandowski | Sharyl Attkisson | Trump's Enemies: How the Deep State Is Undermining the Presidency | |
| December 22, 2018 | DeRay Mckesson | Derrick Johnson | On the Other Side of Freedom: The Case for Hope | |
| December 29, 2018 | Stephen Moore | Veronique de Rugy | Trumponomics: Inside the America First Plan to Revive Our Economy | |
