= List of After Words interviews first aired in 2019 =

After Words is an American television series on the C-SPAN2 network’s weekend programming schedule known as Book TV. The program is an hour-long talk show, each week featuring an interview with the author of a new non-fiction book. The program has no regular host. Instead, each author is paired with a guest host who is familiar with the author or the subject matter of their book.

First air date (Links to video)	Interviewee(s)	Interviewer(s)	Book	Topic of interview / Comments
January 5, 2019	Louise Shelley	Yaya Fanusie	Dark Commerce: How a New Illicit Economy Is Threatening Our Future	
January 12, 2019	Reniqua Allen	Danielle Belton	It Was All a Dream: A New Generation Confronts the Broken Promise to Black America	
January 19, 2019	Sebastian Gorka	Paula Dobriansky	Why We Fight: Defeating America's Enemies - With No Apologies	
January 26, 2019	Stephanie Land	Rachel Schneider	Maid	
February 2, 2018	Chris Christie	Major Garrett	Let Me Finish: Trump, the Kushners, Bannon, New Jersey, and the Power of In-Your-Face Politics	
February 9, 2019	Shoshana Zuboff	Nilay Patel	The Age of Surveillance Capitalism: The Fight for a Human Future at the New Frontier of Power	
February 16, 2019	Jill Abramson	Vivian Schiller	Merchants of Truth: The Business of News and the Fight for Facts	
February 23, 2019	Jason Rezaian	Jared Huffman	Prisoner: My 544 Days in an Iranian Prison	
March 2, 2019	Andrew McCabe	Adam Goldman	The Threat: How the FBI Protects America in the Age of Terror and Trump	
March 9, 2019	Doug Jones	Diane McWhorter	Bending Toward Justice: The Birmingham Church Bombing that Changed the Course of Civil Rights	16th Street Baptist Church bombing
March 16, 2019	Angela Stent	Dina Titus	Putin's World: Russia Against the West and with the Rest	
March 23, 2019	Victor Davis Hanson	Dave Brat	The Case for Trump	
March 30, 2019	George Papadopoulos	Aruna Viswanatha	Deep State Target: How I Got Caught in the Crosshairs of the Plot to Bring Down President Trump	
April 6, 2019	Vicky Ward	Elizabeth Spiers	Kushner, Inc.: Greed. Ambition. Corruption. The Extraordinary Story of Jared Kushner and Ivanka Trump	
April 20, 2019	Arthur Brooks	Ben Sasse	Love Your Enemies: How Decent People Can Save America from the Culture of Contempt	
April 27, 2019	Preet Bharara	Richard Blumenthal	Doing Justice	
May 4, 2019	Jennifer Eberhardt	Val Demings	Biased: Uncovering the Hidden Prejudice That Shapes What We See, Think, and Do	
May 11, 2019	Mike Lee	Nicholas Quinn Rosenkranz	Our Lost Declaration: America’s Fight Against Tyranny from King George to the Deep State	
May 18, 2019	Anuradha Bhagwati	Kate Germano	Unbecoming: A Memoir of Disobedience	
May 25, 2019	Rachel Louise Snyder	Debbie Dingell	No Visible Bruises: What We Don't Know About Domestic Violence Can Kill Us	Domestic violence
June 1, 2019	Scott Pelley	David Gregory	Truth Worth Telling: A Reporter's Search for Meaning in the Stories of Our Time	
June 8, 2019	George Will	Jonah Goldberg	The Conservative Sensibility	
June 15, 2019	Jim Acosta	Jay Rosen	The Enemy of the People: A Dangerous Time to Tell the Truth in America	
June 22, 2019	Nada Bakos	Andre Carson	The Targeter: My Life in the CIA, Hunting Terrorists and Challenging the White House	
June 29, 2019	George Sorial	John Avlon	The Real Deal: My Decade Fighting Battles and Winning Wars with Trump	
July 6, 2019	Jamil Jivani	Bennett Capers	Why Young Men: The Dangerous Allure of Violent Movements and What We Can Do About It	
July 13, 2019	Joy-Ann Reid	Sophia Nelson	The Man Who Sold America: Trump and the Unravelling of the American Story	
July 20, 2019	Mollie Hemingway, Carrie Severino	David G. Savage	Justice on Trial: The Kavanaugh Confirmation and the Future of the Supreme Court	
July 27, 2019	Richard A. Clarke	Dustin Volz	The Fifth Domain: Defending Our Country, Our Companies, and Ourselves in the Age of Cyber Threats	
August 3, 2019	Michael Malice	Ben Domenech	The New Right: A Journey to the Fringe of American Politics	
August 10, 2019	Terry McAuliffe	Dahlia Lithwick	Beyond Charlottesville: Taking a Stand Against White Nationalism	Unite the Right rally
August 17, 2019	Natalie Wexler	Kaya Henderson	The Knowledge Gap: The Hidden Cause of America’s Broken Education System--And How to Fix It	
August 24, 2019	Brent Bozell	Carrie Sheffield	Unmasked: Big Media’s War to Destroy Trump	
August 31, 2019	Ben Howe	John Fea	The Immoral Majority: Why Evangelicals Chose Political Power Over Christian Values	
September 7, 2019	Ibram X. Kendi	Imani Perry	How to Be an Antiracist	
September 14, 2019	Ben Westhoff	Ann McLane Kuster	Fentanyl, Inc.: How Rogue Chemists Are Creating the Deadliest Wave of the Opioid Epidemic	Opioid epidemic
September 21, 2019	Michelle Malkin	Chip Roy	Open Borders Inc.: Who's Funding America's Destruction?	
September 28, 2019	Paul Tough	Sara Goldrick-Rab	The Years That Matter Most: How College Makes or Breaks Us	
October 5, 2019	Bill Gertz	Paula Dobriansky	Deceiving the Sky: Inside Communist China's Drive for Global Supremacy	
October 12, 2019	Susan Rice	Robin Wright	Tough Love: My Story of the Things Worth Fighting For	
October 19, 2019	Gregg Jarrett	Matt Schlapp	Witch Hunt: The Story of the Greatest Mass Delusion in American Political History	
October 26, 2019	Rand Paul	Matt Gaetz	The Case Against Socialism	
November 2, 2019	David Shulkin	Jeremy Butler	It Shouldn't Be This Hard to Serve Your Country: Our Broken Government and the Plight of Veterans	United States Department of Veterans Affairs
November 9, 2019	Newt Gingrich	Oriana Mastro	Trump vs. China: Facing America' Greatest Threat	China–United States relations, Foreign policy of the Donald Trump administration
November 16, 2019	Martha Minow	Paul Butler	When Should Law Forgive?	
November 30, 2019	Sarah Milov	David Kessler	The Cigarette: A Political History	History of commercial tobacco in the United States
December 7, 2019	Lindy West	Rebecca Traister	The Witches Are Coming	
December 14, 2019	Joe Ricketts	William Cohan	The Harder You Work, the Luckier You Get: An Entrepreneur's Memoir	
December 21, 2019	Freeman Hrabowski	Wes Moore	The Empowered University: Shared Leadership, Culture Change, and Academic Success	
December 28, 2019	Thomas Chatterton Williams	Kwame Anthony Appiah	Self-Portrait in Black and White: Unlearning Race	
