= Tobacco in the American colonies =

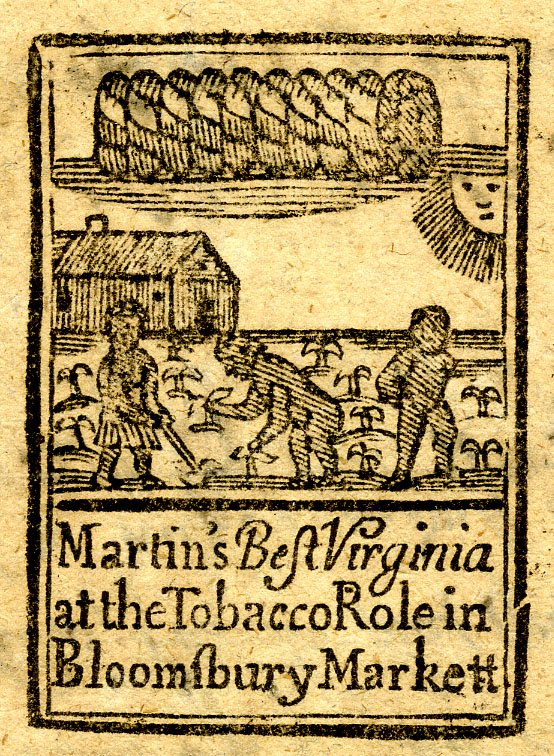
Tobacco advertisement from 18th-century London

Tobacco cultivation and exports formed an essential component of the American colonial economy. It was distinct from rice, wheat, cotton and other cash crops in terms of agricultural demands, trade, slave labor, and plantation culture. Many influential American revolutionaries, including Thomas Jefferson and George Washington, owned tobacco plantations, and were hurt by debt to British tobacco merchants shortly before the American Revolution. For the later period see History of commercial tobacco in the United States.

== Early cultivation ==
The use of tobacco by Native Americans dates back centuries. It was considered a sacred plant with immense healing and spiritual benefits. Native American used tobacco by burning it in pipes. Europeans had never seen tobacco before and quickly learned about its use from Native peoples.

=== John Rolfe ===
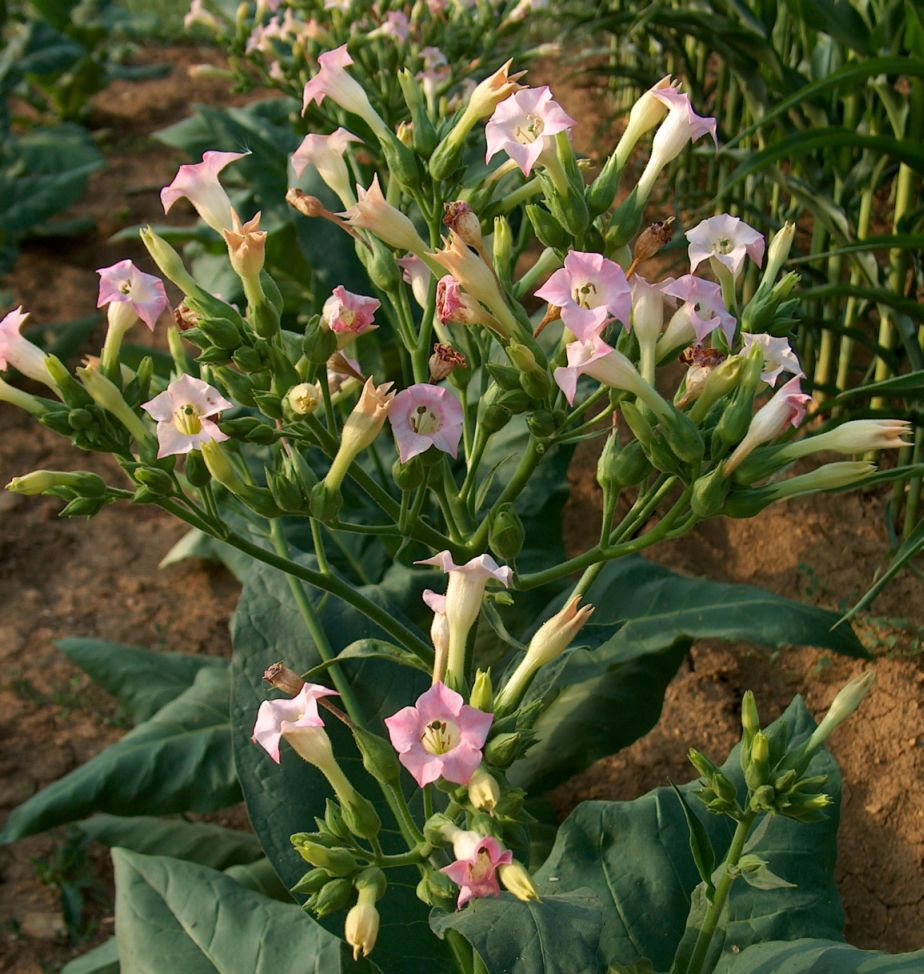
Nicotiana tabacum

In 1610, John Rolfe arrived in Jamestown to find the colonists there struggling and starving. He had brought with him a Caribbean strain of tobacco known as Nicotiana tabacum. This species was preferable to the native Nicotiana rustica, which was harsher. It is unknown exactly where John Rolfe got the seeds for this new species of tobacco, as the sale of the seeds to a non-Spaniard was punishable by death. It is possible he acquired the seeds from the Taino people in the Caribbean, or from plants found in Bermuda (where he was shipwrecked with other colonists). This new Nicotiana tabacum (marketed as "Orinoco tobacco" by Rolfe) proved to be very popular in England and the first shipment was sent in 1614. By 1639, 750 tons of tobacco had been shipped to England.

=== Cultivation methods ===
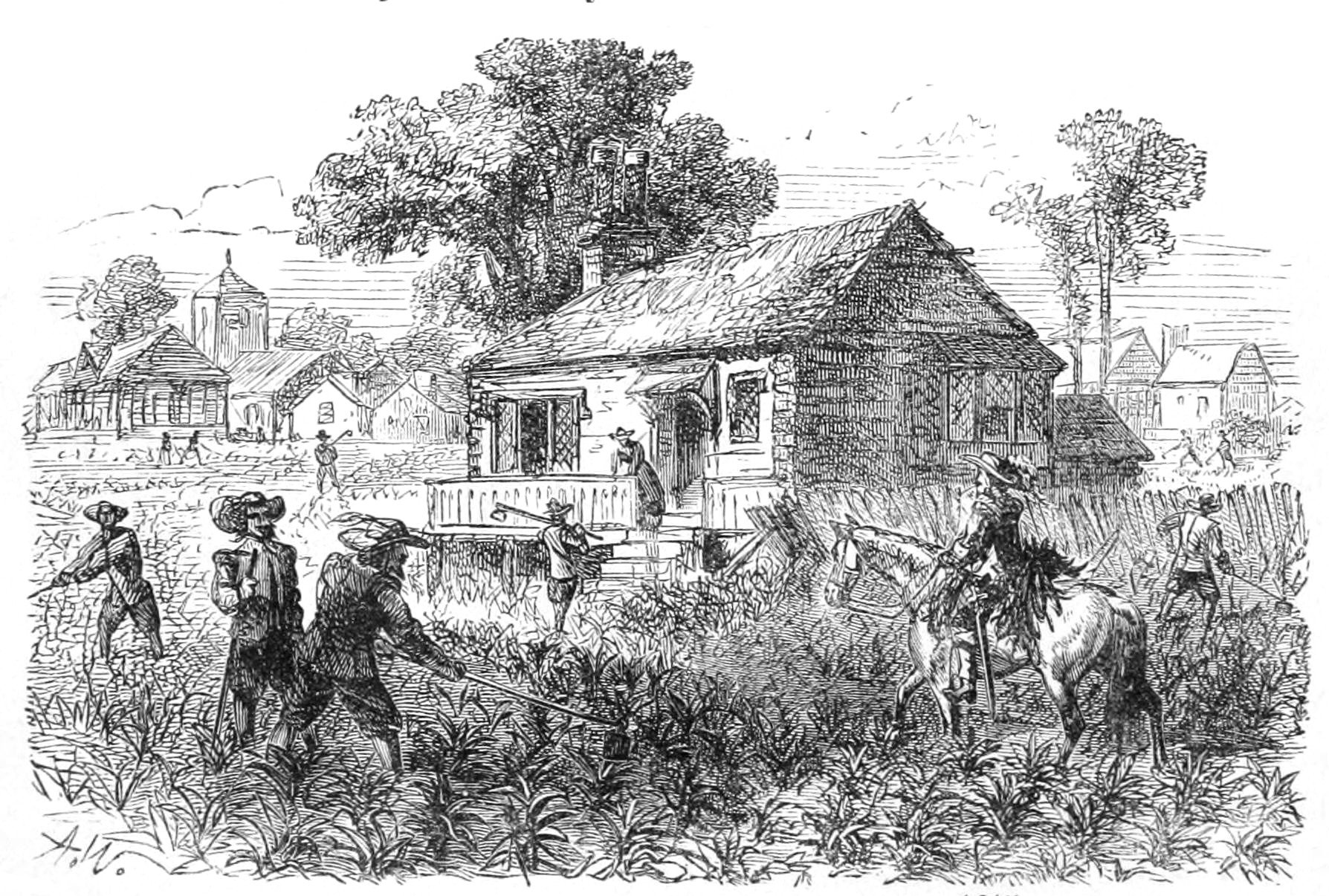
Cultivation of tobacco at Jamestown 1615

In the period of 1619 to 1629, the average tobacco farmer was expected to produce 720 pounds (330 kg) of tobacco in a year. By the period of 1680 to 1699, the output per worker was 1,710 pounds (780 kg) of tobacco in a year. These increases in productivity were brought about primarily from relocation and better farming techniques. While early tobacco cultivation techniques were relatively rudimentary, colonial farmers quickly developed more efficient techniques. Tobacco will wear out the soil in just a few years and this necessitated farmers to relocate from coastal areas up rivers in the Chesapeake Bay area. Production was further increased by the use of slave labor on larger farms. On the frontier, hired help would both farm the tobacco and protect farms from Indian raids.

=== Expansion of trade ===
In 1621, King James prohibited the production of tobacco in England, limiting its growth to the colonies in America. King James found tobacco to be “loathsome to the eye, hateful to the nose, harmful to the brain” and “dangerous to the lungs.”However, colonial tobacco generated vital customs duties and tax income for the Crown. By banning domestic cultivation, English smokers were forced to buy tobacco imported from the colonies in America.

While it would take many years for this to take effect, the prohibition influenced other policies. In reaction to this, the colonies would pass legislation like the Tobacco Inspection Act of 1730 in Virginia as a way to control the production of tobacco and raise its price. Legislation was also passed as a way of ensuring that low-quality trash tobacco was not being shipped or used for the payment of taxes. This series of legislation on both sides of the Atlantic to exert control over the tobacco industry would continue until the American Revolution.

=== Chesapeake Consignment System ===
As the English increasingly used tobacco products, tobacco in the American colonies became a significant economic force, especially in the tidewater region surrounding the Chesapeake Bay. Vast plantations were built along the rivers of Virginia, and social/economic systems were developed to grow and distribute this cash crop. In 1713, the General Assembly (under the leadership of Governor Alexander Spotswood) passed a Tobacco Act requiring the inspection of all tobacco intended for export or for use as legal tender. In 1730, the Virginia House of Burgesses standardized and improved quality of tobacco exported by establishing the Tobacco Inspection Act of 1730, which required inspectors to grade tobacco at 40 specified locations. Some elements of this system included the enslavement and importation of African people to grow crops. Planters filled large hogsheads with tobacco and conveyed them to inspection warehouses.

The tobacco economy in the colonies was embedded in a cycle of leaf demand, slave labor demand, and global commerce that gave rise to the Chesapeake Consignment System and Tobacco Lords. American tobacco farmers would sell their crops on consignment to merchants in London, which required them to take out loans for farm expenses from London guarantors in exchange for tobacco delivery and sale. Further contracts were negotiated with wholesalers in Charleston or New Orleans to ship the tobacco to London merchants. The loan was then repaid with profits from their sales.

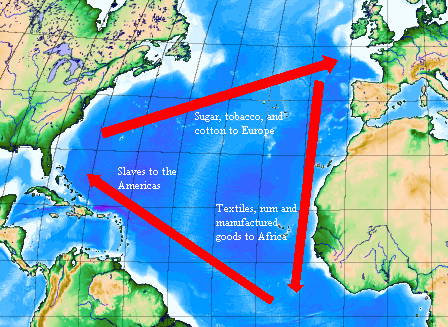
The "Triangular Trade".

American planters responded to increased European demand by expanding the size and output of their plantations. The number of man-hours needed to sustain larger operations increased, which forced planters to acquire and accommodate additional slave labor. Furthermore, they had to secure larger initial loans from London, which increased pressure to produce a profitable crop and made them more financially vulnerable to natural disasters.

== Slave labor on tobacco plantations ==
=== Aftermath of Legalization of Chattel Bondage in 1660s ===
Following the legalization of chattel slavery, slaves slowly and steadily replaced white indentured servants. Native American slaves were also sought after, but dwindling Native population at the end of the 17th century turned focus onto African slaves. Between 1675 and 1695, 3000 black slaves were brought in to the region. In 1668, ratio of white servants to black slaves were around 5-to-1. By 1700, most plantations in Chesapeake had more black slaves than servants.

=== Slave boom in the 1700s ===
The slave population in the Chesapeake increased significantly during the 18th century due to the demand for cheap tobacco labor and a dwindling influx of indentured servants willing to migrate from England. In this century, it is estimated that the Chesapeake African slave population increased from 100,000 to 1 million – a majority of the enslaved workforce and about 40% of the total population. Slaves were not imported to the Chesapeake after 1775, but slave populations continued to increase through 1790 because most were forced by their masters to produce large numbers of offspring.

Before the slave boom, Chesapeake tobacco plantations were characterized by a “culture of assimilation”, where white planters worked alongside their black slaves and racial boundaries were less distinct. As slaveholding increased, intense racial contrasts emerged and all-black labor units supervised by white planters came to replace mixed-race units. Unwritten race-based sumptuary laws, which would later become Jim Crow laws, became common social fixtures in Northern and Southern colonies.

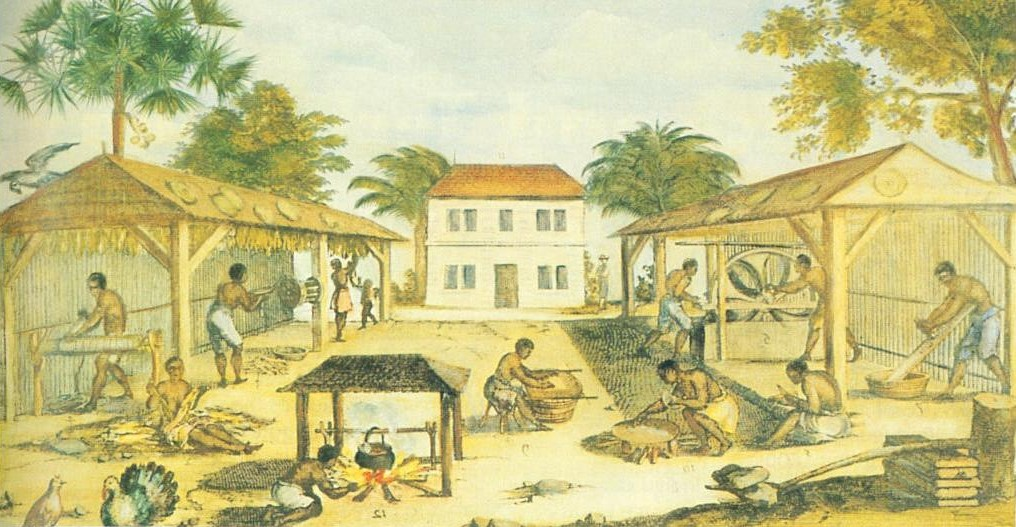
Slaves processing tobacco in Virginia in 1670

For the many farmers who seized the opportunity in the profitable tobacco enterprise, financial and personal anxiety mounted amidst stiff competition and falling prices. Some historians believe that these anxieties were redirected onto subordinates in the field, which exacerbated already strained racial relations. Planters pushed slaves to their physical limits to ensure a superior crop. Slaves, meanwhile, realized that the quality of a crop depended on their effort and began “foot-dragging”, or collectively slowing their pace in protest of the planters' extreme demands. Farmers racialized foot-dragging, portraying it as an inherent personality trait of slaves. William Strickland, a wealthy colonial tobacco planter, remarked:

Nothing can be conceived more inert than a slave; his unwilling labor is discovered in every step he takes; he moves not if he can avoid it; if the eyes of the overseer are off him, he sleeps…all is listless inactivity; all motion is evidently compulsory.

Tensions between slaves and planters occasionally escalated enough to bring work in the field to a standstill. When this occurred, masters often punished insubordinate slaves with physical violence such as lashings and whippings until they resumed their tasks.

=== Differences between the Chesapeake and Deep South ===
In the Chesapeake and North Carolina, tobacco constituted a major percentage of the total agricultural output. In the Deep South (mainly Georgia and South Carolina), cotton and rice plantations dominated. Stark diversity in the geographic and social landscapes of these two regions contributed to differences in their respective slave cultures.

The Chesapeake had few urban centers relative to the South. Instead, multiple markets were established along tributaries. This facilitated the persistence of smaller tobacco farms because the cost of moving tobacco to market was kept reasonable. In the south, all economic activity was fed through a few heavily centralized markets, which favored large plantations that could bear the higher transportation costs. Differences in plantation size also owed significantly to the different demands of tobacco farming versus cotton and rice. Cotton and rice were cash crops, and cultivation was geared towards maximizing volume. Diminishing returns take effect on harvest quality past a certain threshold of labor investment. Tobacco, however, was considered to be more artisanal and craft-like, with limitless opportunities to improve yield and quality. Thus, the most profitable cotton and rice operations were large and factory-like, while tobacco profits hinged on skilled, careful, and efficient labor units.

Because of the diminished need for trained labor, families of slaves on cotton and rice plantations would often remain together, bought and sold as complete packages. Individual life expectancies were generally shorter because their skill set was less refined and workers were easily replaced if killed. Cotton and rice plantation owners employed a management technique called “tasking”, in which each slave would receive around one-half acre of land to tend individually with minimal supervision. The weight of the yield from each slave’s plot was interpreted as a direct reflection of the quality of his work.

In contrast, tobacco planters desired skilled male slaves, while women were mainly responsible for breeding and raising children. Family members were often estranged when women and children left to seek other work. Individual life expectancies for tobacco slaves were generally longer because their unique skills, honed over the course of many years in the field, proved indispensable to a planter’s success. Tobacco planters favored a technique called “ganging”, where groups of eight to twelve slaves worked fields simultaneously under the supervision of a white superior or a tenured slave. The hardest working slaves, called “pace-setters”, were spread amongst the different groups as an example for those around them. Unlike tasking, ganging was amenable to supervision and quality control and lacked an inherent measure of individual effort.

Some contemporary scholars argue that the Chesapeake was a more hospitable environment for slaves. It was more common in the Chesapeake for a slave to work alongside his master, an arrangement unheard of in the strict vertical hierarchies of massive Southern plantations. Whites and blacks were more deeply divided in the Deep South, and tasking allowed slave owners to arbitrarily replace individuals who did not meet expectations. Others argue that it is disingenuous to romanticize one incarnation of slavery over another and that neither environment was “hospitable” despite these differences.

== Colonial tobacco culture ==
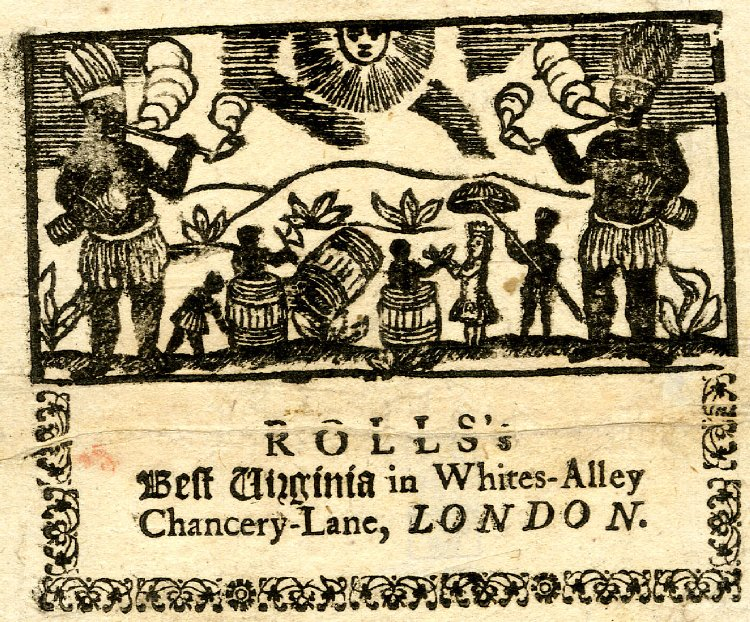
18th-century tobacco advertisement.

A culture of expertise surrounded tobacco planting. Unlike cotton or rice, cultivating tobacco was seen as an art form, and buyers understood that behind every crop of good tobacco was a meticulous planter with exceptional skills. Tobacco shipments were “branded” with a signature unique to its planter before they were sent overseas, and guarantors regarded brands as a seal of approval from the planter himself. One planter proclaimed of his branded tobacco, “it was made on the plantation where I live and therefore as I saw to the whole management of it myself (sic), I can with authority recommend it to be exceedingly good.” Even though not necessarily participate in the manual labor, planters took a great financial stake in their final product.

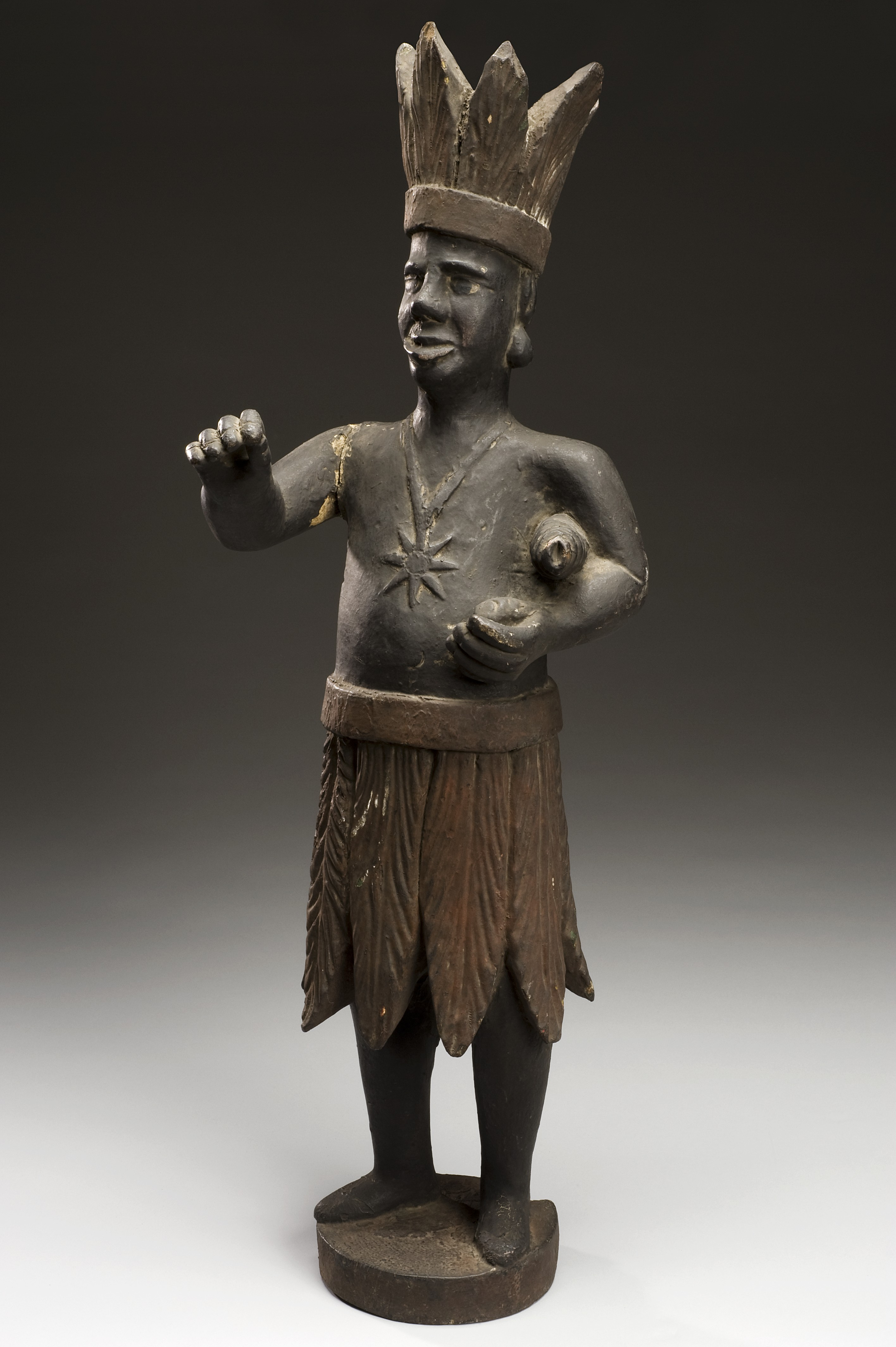
Cigar store Indian likely meant to portray a Powhatan leader, made in ~1750 and used to advertise a tobacconist's shop in England until 1900.

Furthermore, local reputation and social status varied with the quality of one’s leaf. In his book Tobacco Culture, author T.H. Breen writes “quite literally, the quality of a man’s tobacco often served as the measure of the man.” Proficient planters, held in high regard by their peers, often exercised significant political clout in colonial governments. Farmers often spent excess profits on expensive luxury goods from London to indicate to others that their tobacco was selling well. Notably, Thomas Jefferson’s Monticello estate was styled after the dwellings of a wealthy European aristocrat.

== Economic impact of the early tobacco industry ==
=== Economic growth in the early colonies ===
Tobacco played a major role in the development of the early Chesapeake Colonies. With the early tobacco boom in Virginia and the expansion of trade with England, the value of tobacco soared and provided an incentive for a large influx of colonists. In Virginia, the rough climate made it difficult for the colonists to produce crops that were necessary for survival. Due to this difficulty, the colonists lacked a source of income and food. The colonists of Virginia began to grow tobacco. Tobacco brought the colonists a large source of revenue that was used to pay taxes and fines, purchase slaves, and to purchase manufactured goods from England. As the colonies grew, so did their production of tobacco. Slaves and indentured servants were brought into the colonies to participate in tobacco farming. It has been said that some colonies would have continued to fail had it not been for the production of tobacco. Tobacco provided the early colonies with an opportunity for expansion and economic success.

=== British mercantilism and monopolization of the tobacco trade ===
As early as 1621, only 14 years after the establishment of a colony in Virginia and just 9 years after John Rolfe discovered the economic potential of tobacco in America, British merchants were on the march in an attempt to control the tobacco trade. A measure was introduced into the British Parliament in 1621 with two major components: a restriction on tobacco importation from anywhere with the exception of Virginia and the British West Indies and an edict that tobacco was not to be grown and cultivated anywhere else within England. The objective of the merchants was to monopolize and control all means of tobacco distribution within Europe and throughout the world. By doing so it was possible to secure a stable return on investment for the American Colonies and profit tremendously within Europe. The British merchants influenced economies using the power of the nation-state to influence and protect business interests. In exchange, taxes were levied in order to fund political interests. The bill that the merchants put forward in 1621 to Parliament was a classic example of the power and influence of mercantilism.

The measure passed the House of Commons although it was defeated in the House of Lords. Despite this defeat the measure eventually was pushed through by proclamation from King James. Ironically King James had very strong opinions against the use of tobacco, pointing to the ill health effects and social impact of those that used tobacco Despite these grievances the King was then able to capture import duties on tobacco and in exchange monopoly power was granted to the merchants.

The measures also prevented any foreign ships from carrying colonial tobacco. This monopolization became extremely profitable and flourished during the 1600s. The economy of Virginia was extremely dependent on the tobacco trade. So much so that subtle shifts in demand and prices dramatically affected the Virginian economy as a whole. This led to several booms and busts related to tobacco. The price of tobacco dropped from 6.50 pennies per pound in the 1620s down to as low as .80 pennies per pound in the 1690s. This downward trending triggered a whole series of crop controls and government sponsored price manipulations throughout the 1600s to try to stabilize pricing, but to no avail.

=== Cash crop ===
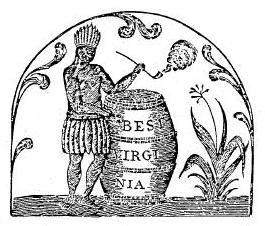
Lorillard hogshead, 1789

By the mid 1620s tobacco became the most common commodity for bartering due to the increasing scarcity of gold and silver and the decreasing value of wampum from forgery and overproduction. In order to help with accounting and standardizing trade, colonial government officials would rate tobacco and compare its weight into values of pounds, shillings, and pence. The popularity of American tobacco increased dramatically in the colonial period eventually leading to English goods being traded equally with tobacco. Because England's climate did not allow for the same quality of tobacco as that grown in America, the colonists did not have to worry about scarcity of tobacco. This eventually led to tobacco being the main form of trade with England.

Imports of tobacco into England increased from 60,000 pounds in 1622 to 500,000 pounds in 1628, and to 1,500,000 pounds in 1639. Such dramatic growth in demand for tobacco eventually led to overproduction of the commodity, and in turn extreme devaluation of tobacco. To compensate for the loss of value, farmers would add dirt and leaves to increase the weight, but lowering the quality. From the 1640s to the 1690s the value of tobacco would be highly unstable, government officials would help stabilize tobacco by reducing the amount of tobacco produced, standardizing the size of a tobacco hogshead, and prohibiting shipments of bulk tobacco. Eventually the tobacco currency would stabilize in the early 1700s but would be short lived as farmers started cutting back on growing tobacco. In the 1730s tobacco crops were being replaced with food crops as the colonies moved closer to revolution with England.

== American Revolution and New Republic ==
American tobacco planters, including Jefferson and George Washington, financed their plantations with sizeable loans from London. When tobacco prices dropped precipitously in the 1750s, many plantations struggled to remain financially solvent. Severe debt threatened to unravel colonial power structures and destroy planters’ personal reputations. At his Mount Vernon plantation, Washington saw his liabilities swell to nearly £2000 by the late 1760s. Jefferson, on the verge of losing his own farm, aggressively espoused various conspiracy theories. Though never verified, Jefferson accused London merchants of unfairly depressing tobacco prices and forcing Virginia farmers to take on unsustainable debt loads. In 1786, he remarked:

A powerful engine for this [mercantile profiting] was the giving of good prices and credit to the planter till they got him more immersed in debt than he could pay without selling lands or slaves. They then reduced the prices given for his tobacco so that…they never permitted him to clear off his debt.

The inability to pay what one owed was not just a financial failing, but a moral one. Planters whose operations collapsed were condemned as “sorry farmers” – unable to produce good crops and inept at managing their land, slaves, and assets. Washington excused his situation thusly:

Mischance rather than Misconduct hath been the cause of [my debt]…It is but an irksome thing to a free mind to be always hampered in Debt.

In conjunction with a global financial crisis and growing animosity toward British rule, tobacco interests helped unite disparate colonial players and produced some of the most vocal revolutionaries behind the call for American independence. A spirit of rebellion arose from their claims that insurmountable debts prevented the exercise of basic human freedoms.

=== Aftermath ===
Due to the Revolutionary War, Southern exports dropped by 39% from the upper South and almost 50% from the lower South. Lack of domestic market growth exacerbated these effects and a stagnated tobacco industry failed to fully recover as cotton became the main cash crop of the south going forward.

According to historian Avery Craven, tobacco caused systematic soil depletion that shaped both agricultural development and the broader socio-economic order. Agriculture in Virginia and Maryland relied on a single crop and exploitative practices, causing declining yields and exhausted lands. Land that had originally been highly fertile became useless and was abandoned on a wide scale. Planters realized the waste and knew they would have to move on to fresh land. The lack of proper plowing and cultivation methods led to destructive erosion, while continuous replanting depleted essential plant nutrients and encouraged harmful soil organisms. The failure to add organic matter or fertilizers worsened the situation. As a result, expansion became necessary to maintain productivity, leading to social, economic, and political conflicts, as well as a decline in living standards. Although some observers blamed slavery as a major cause, Craven discounts its role in soil exhaustion.

== See also ==
- History of Virginia
- Tobacco Lords, merchants in Scotland
- Tobacco colonies
- History of commercial tobacco in the United States
- Plantation economy
- Tobacco and Slaves (1986 book)

== References and further reading ==
- Beer, George Louis. The origins of the British colonial system, 1578-1660 (1908) good coverage of imperial system of exploiting tobacco online
- Bradburn, Douglas. "The Visible Fist: The Chesapeake Tobacco Trade in War and the Purpose of Empire, 1690–1715". William and Mary Quarterly 68.3 (2011): 361-386. doi:10.5309/willmaryquar.68.3.0361.
- Bradburn, Douglas M., and John C. Coombs. "SMOKE AND MIRRORS: Reinterpreting the society and economy of the seventeenth-century Chesapeake". Atlantic Studies 3.2 (2006): 131-157; argues the need to study regional tobacco cultures, trade with Caribbean, trade with the Indians, internal markets, shipbuilding, and western land development.
- Breen, T. H. Tobacco Culture: the Mentality of the Great Tidewater Planters on the Eve of Revolution. Princeton, N.J.: Princeton UP (1985)
- Clemens, Paul GE. "Reimagining the political economy of early Virginia". William and Mary Quarterly 68.3 (2011): 393-397. online
- Coclanis, Peter A. "Tobacco Road: New Views of the Early Chesapeake". William and Mary Quarterly 68.3 (2011): 398-404. online
- Cogswell, Thomas. "‘In the Power of the State’: Mr Anys's Project and the Tobacco Colonies, 1626–1628". English Historical Review 123.500 (2008): 35-64; a failed scheme for a transatlantic monopoly of Virginian and Bermudan tobacco.
- Goodman, Jordan. Wholly Built Upon Smoke" Tobacco in History: The Cultures of Dependence. London: Routledge (1993).
- Goodman, Jordan. Tobacco in History and Culture: An Encyclopedia (2 vol Thomason-Gale, 2005)
- Gray, Lewis Cecil. History of agriculture in the southern United States to 1860 (1933) vol 1 pp 213-276 online
- Hardin, David S. " 'The Same Sort of Seed in Different Earths': Tobacco Types and Their Regional Variation in Colonial Virginia" Historical Geography (2006), Vol. 34, pp. 137-158.
- Harris-Scott, Steven Anthony. "Northern Virginia, A Place Apart: Bound Labor in Virginia's Northern Neck, 1645-1710" (PhD dissertation, George Mason U. 2016) online enslaved tobacco workers.
- Hirschfelder, Arlene B. Encyclopedia of Smoking and Tobacco (Oryx, 1999)
- Hemphill, John M. Virginia and the English Commercial System, 1689–1733: Studies in the Development and Fluctuations of a Colonial Economy under Imperial Control (Garland, 1985).
- Kulikoff, Allan. Tobacco and Slaves: The Development of Southern Cultures in the Chesapeake, 1680–1800 (University of North Carolina Press, 1986) online
- Lorenz, Stacy L. " 'To Do Justice to His Majesty, the Merchant and the Planter': Governor William Gooch and the Virginia Tobacco Inspection Act of 1730" Virginia Magazine of History and Biography 108 (2000): 345–392. online
- McCusker, John J., and Russell R. Menard. The Economy of British America, 1607–1789 (University of North Carolina Press 1985)
- MacMillan, Ken. "Tobacco and the Economy of Empire". in The Atlantic Imperial Constitution: Center and Periphery in the English Atlantic World (Palgrave Macmillan US, 2011) pp. 85-111 online
- Menard, Russell R. "Plantation empire: How sugar and tobacco planters built their industries and raised an empire". Agricultural History 81.3 (2007): 309-332. https://doi.org/10.1215/00021482-81.3.309
- Menard, Russell R. "The tobacco industry in the Chesapeake colonies, 1617-1730: An interpretation". in The Atlantic Slave Trade (Routledge, 2022) pp. 377-445.
- Monroe, J. Cameron, and Seth Mallios. "A seventeenth-century colonial cottage industry: New evidence and a dating formula for colono tobacco pipes in the Chesapeake". Historical Archaeology 38 (2004): 68-82. online
- Morgan, Philip D. Slave Counterpoint: Black Culture in the Eighteenth-century Chesapeake and Lowcountry. (University of North Carolina Press, 1998). online
- Price, Jacob M. "The rise of Glasgow in the Chesapeake tobacco trade, 1707-1775". William and Mary Quarterly (1954) pp: 179-199. in JSTOR
- Price, Jacob M. France and the Chesapeake: A History of the French Tobacco Monopoly, 1674–1791, and of its Relationship to the British and American Tobacco Trades (University of Michigan Press, 1973. 2 vols) online book review
- Rainbolt, John C. “The Case of the Poor Planters in Virginia for Inspecting and Burning Tobacco.” Virginia Magazine of History and Biography 79 (1971): 314–321.
- Robert, Joseph C. The Story of Tobacco in America (UNC 1949), good short introduction.
- Rutman, Anita H. "Still Planting the Seeds of Hope: The Recent Literature of the Early Chesapeake Region". The Virginia Magazine Jan. (1987)
- Ragsdale, Bruce A. "George Washington, the British tobacco trade, and economic opportunity in prerevolutionary Virginia". Virginia Magazine of History and Biography 97.2 (1989): 132-162. online
- Robert, Joseph C. The Story of Tobacco in America (UNC 1949) online good brief introduction to pre-1799 era pp 3-73.
- Salmon, Emily & Salmon, John. "Tobacco in Colonial Virginia" in Encyclopedia Virginia (2020) online.
- Walsh, Lorena S. "Summing the parts: implications for estimating Chesapeake output and income subregionally". William and Mary Quarterly 56.1 (1999): 53-94. online
- Walsh, Lorena S. Motives of Honor, Pleasure, and Profit: Plantation Management in the Colonial Chesapeake, 1607–1763 (2010) online.

=== Primary sources ===
- Billings, Warren M., ed. The old dominion in the seventeenth century: A documentary history of Virginia, 1606-1700 (U of North Carolina Press Books, 1975), pp 175–204. online
