= Act for Regulating Surveyors =

The Act for Regulating Surveyors of 1683 was a law of the Colony of Jamaica that provided that the Crown surveyor was to be responsible for surveys in Jamaica only when the Crown was a party to the relevant matter and that otherwise, any person may make a survey. It was revised by An Act For Further Directing and Regulating the Proceedings of Surveys in the same year. The acts were significant due to the importance of surveys in the functioning of the plantation economy of the colony.
