= Michael Dubke =

American political aide (born 1970)

Mike Dubke
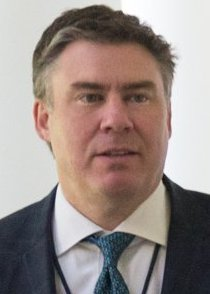
- Dubke c. 2017

White House Communications Director
- In office March 6, 2017 – June 2, 2017
- President: Donald Trump
- Preceded by: Sean Spicer (acting)
- Succeeded by: Sean Spicer (acting)

Personal details
- Born: April 18, 1970 (age 56) Hamburg, New York, U.S.
- Party: Republican
- Spouse: Shannon Mullins
- Children: 2
- Education: Hamilton College, New York (BA)

Michael D. Dubke (born April 18, 1970) is an American entrepreneur and political aide who was the White House Communications Director for U.S. President Donald Trump from March to June 2, 2017.

Dubke worked in political affairs since the 1980s. He founded Crossroads Media, which serves as the media services arm of American Crossroads, and co-founded the Black Rock Group, a public relations firm.

== Early life ==
Dubke is a native of Hamburg, New York and attended Hamburg High School. He is a graduate of Hamilton College.

== Career ==
According to Dubke, he has been involved in political affairs since 1988. Several of the organizations that he has worked for operate out of the same office building at 66 Canal Center Plaza, Alexandria, Virginia. Questions about election ethics have been raised based on the organizations' various connections to political campaigns.

=== Ripon Society ===
Dubke held the position of executive director of both the Ripon Society, a national organization of moderate Republicans, and the Ripon Educational Fund. Dubke stated he and the Ripon Society publicly endorsed Senator Bob Dole for president during the 1996 election. In 1996, Dole stated in an interview with Peter Jennings that he would vote against the Human Life Amendment, then reversed course and affirmed his anti-abortion stance. Dubke, on behalf of the Ripon Society, urged Bob Dole's campaign to give way to a more tolerant position on abortion and to incorporate it into the Republican Party platform.

=== Americans for Job Security ===
Michael Dubke, David Carney, and several business groups helped start Americans for Job Security in 1997. Dubke was the first executive director and then president of Americans for Job Security until April 2008.

=== Crossroads Media ===
In 2001, Dubke founded the Republican media services firm Crossroads Media. It was brought to a level of national prominence during the 2008 presidential campaign. The company provides services for American Crossroads, a super PAC founded by Karl Rove. While at Crossroads Media, Dubke worked on the campaign of New York congressman Chris Collins.

=== Black Rock Group ===
Dubke co-founded the Black Rock Group with political operative Carl Forti. Dubke also served as a partner at the firm, which served overall strategists and consultants for Senator Lisa Murkowski's Alaska re-election effort in 2016. Dubke also handled media for Republican Dan Sullivan's successful 2014 campaign against Mark Begich, also in Alaska.

=== White House Communications Director ===
President Donald Trump offered Dubke the role of White House Director of Communications. He began on March 6, 2017. The White House announced he had submitted his resignation on May 30, 2017, approximately three months later. The White House did not announce his exact date of departure or who would be replacing him. Dubke was originally to remain as communications director to assist in selecting his successor, according to one-time White House Chief of Staff Reince Priebus, however, his last day was June 2. Sean Spicer resumed the post as acting Director.

== Personal life ==
Dubke and his wife, Shannon, live in Alexandria, Virginia, where they raised their two sons, Harry and Sam. Harry, the elder son, followed in his father's footsteps and attended Hamilton College from 2015 until his graduation in 2019.

Political offices
Preceded by Sean Spicer; Acting	White House Director of Communications; 2017	Succeeded by Sean Spicer; Acting
