= Kushner, Inc. =

2019 book by Vicky Ward

- Cover of Kushner, Inc.
- Author: Vicky Ward
- Language: English
- Subject: Kushner family
- Publication date: 19 March 2019
- Publication place: United States
- Pages: 320
- ISBN: 978-1-2501-8594-5

Kushner, Inc.: Greed. Ambition. Corruption. The Extraordinary Story of Jared Kushner and Ivanka Trump is a 2019 book by the English-American journalist Vicky Ward. It is about the Kushner family and in particular Jared Kushner, son-in-law of Donald Trump.

== Summary ==
The book is about the real-estate investor Jared Kushner and his Modern Orthodox Jewish family, the Kushners. The family includes Jared Kushner's criminal father Charles Kushner, who founded the family business Kushner Companies together with his father Joseph Kushner in 1985. Jared Kushner's wife is Ivanka Trump, daughter of Donald Trump, to whom Kushner served as a senior advisor during the 2017–2021 presidency.

== Reception ==
Kushner, Inc. was described in The Guardian as "a lethal amalgam of Page Six-like dish and firsthand investigative reporting".
