= Melting Pot or Civil War? =

2018 book by Reihan Salam

- Author: Reihan Salam
- Language: English
- Genre: Non-fiction
- Publication date: 2018
- Publication place: United States

Melting Pot or Civil War? is a 2018 book about American immigration policy by Reihan Salam.

Salem argues for reforming American policy to favor immigration by skilled and educated people over what he terms the present policy of admitting large number of unskilled people under family “reunification” category. Salam argues that educated immigrants are more likely to integrate into the American cultural mainstream and to make positive economic contributions.

Salam, the son of immigrants from Bangladesh, was born in the United States.

According to Salam, low-skilled immigrants working menial jobs have an incentive to immigrate because even the lifestyle that can be supported by low-paid, physical work in the United States is often better than what they would have if they had stayed in their countries of origin. According to his figures, 24% of all children in the U.S. are the children of immigrants, but 30% of children living in poverty are the children of immigrants. Salam also claims that most immigrants who succeed in earning good livings in America came from educated families and arrived in the United States with advanced educations.
