= Plantation economy =

Economy based on agricultural mass production

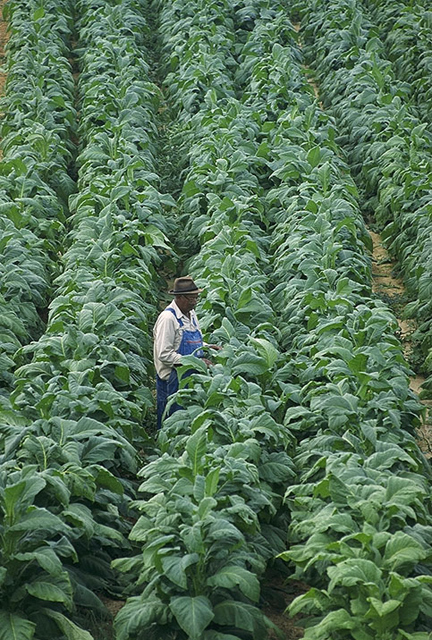
Tobacco field

A plantation economy is an economy based on agricultural mass production, usually of a few commodity crops, grown on large farms worked by laborers or slaves. The properties are called plantations. Plantation economies rely on the export of cash crops as a source of income. Prominent crops included cotton, rubber, sugar cane, tobacco, figs, rice, kapok, sisal, Red Sandalwood, and species in the genus Indigofera, used to produce indigo dye.

The longer a crop's harvest period, the more efficient plantations become. Economies of scale are also achieved when the distance to market is long. Plantation crops usually need processing immediately after harvesting. Sugarcane, tea, sisal, and palm oil are most suited to plantations, while coconuts, rubber, and cotton are suitable to a lesser extent.

== Conditions for formation ==
Plantation economies are factory-like, industrialised and centralised forms of agriculture, owned by large corporations or affluent owners. Under normal circumstances, plantation economies are not as efficient as small farm holdings, since there is immense difficulty in proper supervision of labour over a large land area. When there are large distances between the plantations and their markets, processing can reduce the bulk of the crop and lower shipping costs.

Large plantations producing large quantities of a good are able to achieve economies of scale for expensive processing machinery, as the per unit cost of processing is greatly diminished. This economy of scale can be achieved best with tropical crops that are harvested continuously through the year, fully utilising the processing machinery. Examples of crops that are suitable to be processed are sugar, sisal, palm oil, and tea.

== American plantations ==
In the Thirteen Colonies, plantations were concentrated in the South. These colonies included Maryland, Virginia, North Carolina, South Carolina, and Georgia. They had good soil and long growing seasons, ideal for crops such as rice and tobacco. The existence of many waterways in the region made transportation easier. Each colony specialized in one or two crops, with Virginia standing out in tobacco production. The North meanwhile focused more on food crops like corn and had a structure of yeoman farmers in addition to manufacturing. By the time of the American Civil War this structural difference provided the loyal states with a significant advantage in industrial output and a greater ease of feeding their armies. By contrast the extractive cash crop economy of the rebel states was hampered by the blockade and shortsighted King Cotton diplomacy. The Northern states processed the output of their farms and mines into intermediate or finished goods (corn into whiskey, iron ore and coal into steel etc.) whereas the South relied to a much larger extent on exporting raw goods to either the North or Europe (e.g. most cotton was spun into yarn and cloth in Europe or the North, not the South where it was produced). Consequently the North favored high protective tariffs whereas the South advocated for free trade.

== Slavery ==
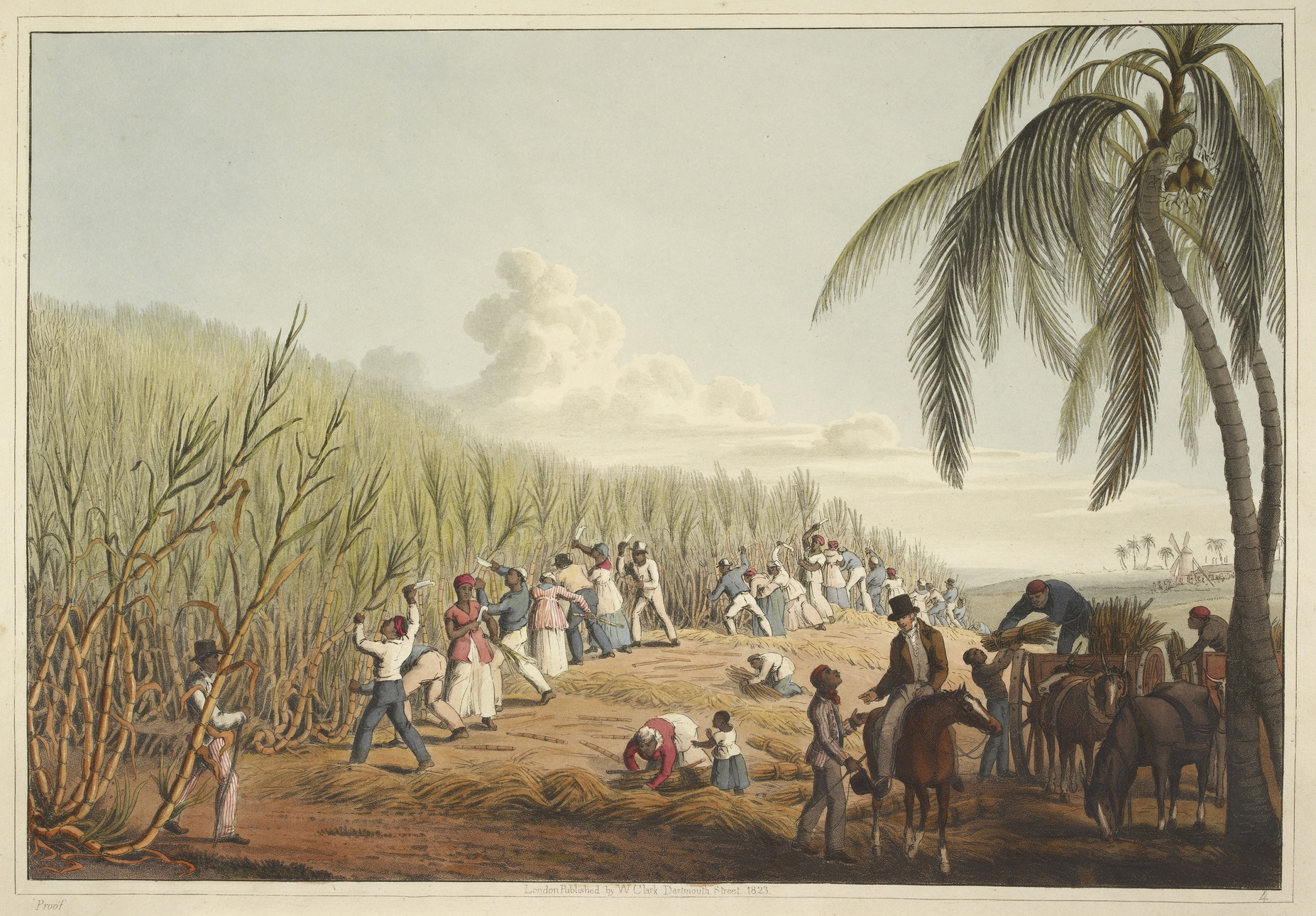
Sugar plantation in the British colony of Antigua, 1823

Planters embraced the use of slaves mainly because indentured labor became expensive. Some indentured servants were also leaving to start their own farms as land was widely available. Colonists tried to use Native Americans for labor, but they were susceptible to European diseases and died in large numbers. The plantation owners then turned to enslaved Africans for labor. In 1665, there were fewer than 500 Africans in Virginia but by 1750, 85 percent of the 235,000 slaves lived in the Southern colonies, Virginia included. Africans made up 40 percent of the South's population.

According to the 1840 United States census, one out of every four families in Virginia owned slaves. There were over 100 plantation owners who owned over 100 slaves. The number of slaves in the 15 States was just shy of 4 million in a total population of 12.4 million, and the percentage was 32% of the population.

Number of slaves by region
Region	Slaves	Percent of population	Total population
Lower South	2,312,352	47%	4.919 million
Upper South	1,208,758	29%	4.165 million
Border States	432,586	13%	3.323 million

Fewer than one-third of white Southern families owned slaves at the peak of slavery prior to the Civil War. In Mississippi and South Carolina the figure approached one half. The total number of slave owners was 385,000 (including, in Louisiana, some free African Americans), amounting to approximately 3.8% of the Southern and Border states population.

== Industrial Revolution in Europe ==
Western Europe was the final destination for the plantation produce. At this time, Europe was starting to industrialize, and it needed a lot of materials to manufacture goods. Being the power center of the world at the time, they exploited the New World and Africa to industrialize. Africa supplied slaves for the plantations; the New World produced raw material for industries in Europe. Manufactured goods, of higher value, were then sold both to Africa and the New World. The system was largely run by European merchants.

== Indigo plantations ==
Indigofera was a major crop cultivated during the 18th century, in Venezuela, Guatemala—and Haiti until the slave rebellion against France that left them embargoed by Europe and India in the 19th and 20th centuries. The indigo crop was grown for making blue indigo dye in the pre-industrial age.

Mahatma Gandhi's investigation of indigo workers' claims of exploitation led to the passage of the Champaran Agrarian Bill in 1917 by the British colonial government.

== Southeast Asia ==
In Southeast Asia British and Dutch colonies established plantations to produce agricultural commodity products including tea, pepper and other spices, palm oil, coffee, and rubber. Large scale agricultural production continues in many areas.

== See also ==
- Banana republic
- History of commercial tobacco in the United States
- History of sugar
- King Cotton
- Latifundium
- Sugar plantations in the Caribbean
- Tropical agriculture
