= Sean Spicer =

American political aide (born 1971)

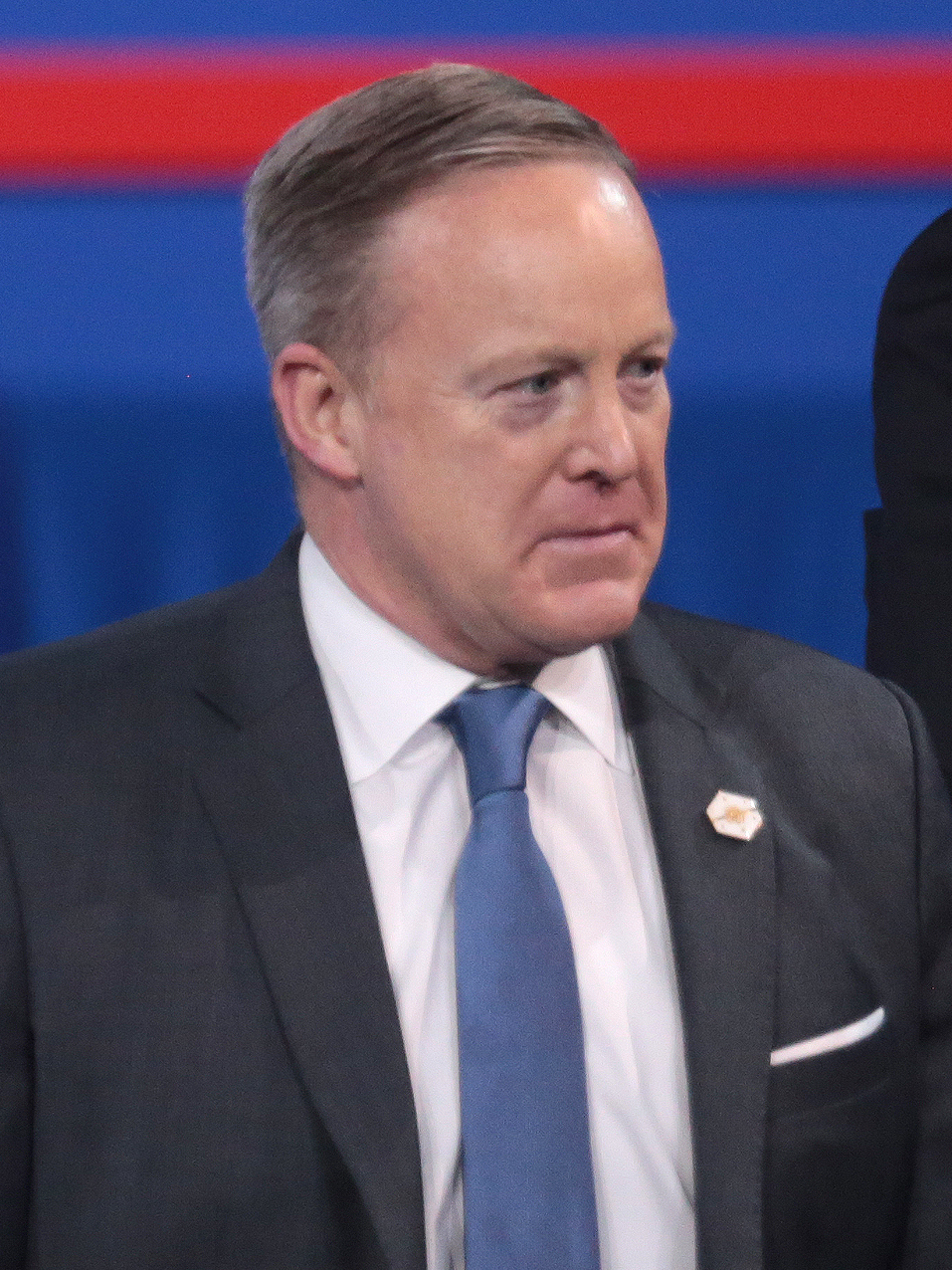
- Spicer in 2017

30th White House Press Secretary
- In office January 20, 2017 – July 21, 2017
- President: Donald Trump
- Deputy: Sarah Huckabee Sanders
- Preceded by: Josh Earnest
- Succeeded by: Sarah Huckabee Sanders

Acting White House Communications Director
- In office June 2, 2017 – July 21, 2017
- President: Donald Trump
- Preceded by: Michael Dubke
- Succeeded by: Anthony Scaramucci
- In office January 20, 2017 – March 6, 2017
- President: Donald Trump
- Preceded by: Jen Psaki
- Succeeded by: Michael Dubke

Personal details
- Born: Sean Michael Spicer; September 23, 1971 (age 55) Manhasset, New York, U.S.
- Party: Republican
- Spouse: Rebecca Miller (m. 2004)
- Children: 2
- Education: Connecticut College (BA); Naval War College (MA)

Military service
- Allegiance: United States
- Branch/service: United States Navy
- Years of service: 1999–present
- Rank: Captain
- Unit: U.S. Navy Reserve
- Awards: Armed Forces Reserve Medal with "M" Device; National Defense Service Medal; Defense Meritorious Service Medal (2); Navy and Marine Corps Achievement Medal; Joint Service Achievement Medal (2); Navy and Marine Corps Commendation Medal; Expert Pistol Marksman; Global War on Terrorism Service Medal; Military Outstanding Volunteer Service Medal; Antarctica Service Medal

Sean Michael Spicer (born September 23, 1971) is an American political commentator, naval officer, and former political aide who served as the 30th White House press secretary and as acting White House communications director under President Donald Trump in 2017. Spicer was communications director of the Republican National Committee from 2011 to 2017, and its chief strategist from 2015 to 2017. Since 2023, Spicer has served as a political contributor for cable network NewsNation. Spicer was also the co-host of the daily podcast The Morning Meeting with Mark Halperin and Dan Turrentine on the 2WAY Network.

During his tenure as White House press secretary, Spicer made a number of public statements that were controversial and false and developed a contentious relationship with the White House press corps. The first such instance occurred on January 21, 2017, the day following Trump's inauguration. Spicer repeated the claim that crowds at Trump's inauguration ceremony were the largest ever at such an event and that the press had deliberately underestimated the number of spectators. After this statement was widely criticized, Trump aide Kellyanne Conway said that Spicer had presented what she called "alternative facts" regarding the inauguration's attendance numbers.

Spicer resigned as White House Press Secretary on July 21, 2017, although he remained at the White House in an unspecified capacity until August 31. As of 2026, Spicer is the most recent male to have served as White House Press Secretary. Since leaving the White House, Spicer has published the memoir The Briefing: Politics, the Press, and the President, appeared as a contestant on season 28 of Dancing with the Stars, and hosted a political talk show on Newsmax TV. He hosts a radio show on WABC (AM) called Full Court Press.

== Early life ==
Spicer is the son of Kathryn (née Grossman) and Michael William Spicer (1944–2016). The Spicers were living in Port Washington when Sean was born at North Shore Hospital in Manhasset, New York. Spicer grew up in the East Bay area of Rhode Island. His father was an insurance agent and his mother was the department manager (a non-faculty position) in the East Asian studies department at Brown University.

Spicer is of partial Irish descent, and was raised Catholic. From 1985 to 1989, he attended Portsmouth Abbey School, a Catholic boarding school in Rhode Island. While in high school, he volunteered for local political campaigns in Rhode Island and continued those activities while at college.

Spicer attended Connecticut College from 1989 to 1993 and graduated with a Bachelor of Arts degree in government. In college he was a student senator. In April 1993, an article in the student paper, The College Voice, referred to Spicer as "Sean Sphincter"; Spicer submitted a complaint to the paper and followed up by pushing for legal action against the paper, for which he was satirized by the campus satirical publication Blats. The incident was later cited as a precursor of his contentious relationship with the media.

In 2012, he acquired a master's degree in national security and strategic studies from the Naval War College in Newport, Rhode Island.

== Early career ==
After graduating from college in 1993, Spicer worked on a number of political campaigns. In the late 1990s, he worked for representatives Mike Pappas (R-NJ), Frank LoBiondo (R-NJ), Mark Foley (R-FL), and Clay Shaw (R-FL).

In 1999, Spicer joined the United States Navy Reserve as a public affairs officer; he currently holds the rank of Captain. As of December 2016, he was assigned to the Joint Chiefs of Staff's naval reserve contingent in Washington, D.C., and in 2017 was a member of the Department of Defense Criminal Investigative Task Force.

=== Early government appointments ===
From 2000 to 2001, Spicer was the communications director on the House Government Reform Committee, and from 2001 to 2002, he was director of incumbent retention at the National Republican Congressional Committee (NRCC).

From 2003 to 2005, Spicer was the communications director and spokesman for the House Budget Committee. He subsequently was the communications director for the Republican Conference of the U.S. House of Representatives, and then, from 2006 to 2009, was the assistant for media and public affairs at the Office of the United States Trade Representative in President George W. Bush's administration. Spicer wore an Easter Bunny suit during the White House Easter Egg Rolls. Spicer was also an elector from Virginia in the 2004 presidential election, one of 13 pledged to George W. Bush.

== Endeavor Global Strategies ==
From 2009 to 2011, Spicer was a partner at Endeavor Global Strategies, a public relations firm he co-founded to represent foreign governments and corporations with business before the U.S. government. His clients included the government of Colombia, which was then seeking a free trade agreement with the U.S. amid public criticism of its human rights record. Spicer worked full-time at the firm until February 2011.

== Republican National Committee ==
In February 2011, Spicer became the communications director of the Republican National Committee. At the RNC, he enlarged the organization's social media operations, built an in-house TV production team, and created a rapid response program to reply to attacks. In February 2015, he was given an additional role, as chief strategist for the party.

While at the RNC, Spicer was critical of then Republican presidential candidate Donald Trump. In June 2015, after Trump said illegal immigrants from Mexico were involved in crimes in the U.S., Spicer said "painting Mexican Americans with that kind of a brush, I think that's probably something that is not helpful to the cause." In July 2015, he released a public criticism of Trump's comments on U.S. Senator John McCain, saying "there is no place in our party or our country for comments that disparage those who have served honorably."

== Press secretary for the Trump administration ==
On December 22, 2016, Spicer was named the White House press secretary for Donald Trump. On December 24, he was also named the communications director for the Trump administration after the sudden and unexpected resignation of Jason Miller.

An April 2017 Politico/Morning Consult poll showed that Spicer had a nationwide name recognition of 60%, much higher than most other White House staffers and previous press secretaries.

=== First statement to the press ===
Spicer giving his first press statement

On January 21, 2017, which was the day after the inauguration and two days before his first official press conference, Spicer made a statement to the press that was critical of the media; stating that they had underestimated the size of the crowds for President Trump's inaugural ceremony. He claimed that the ceremony had drawn the "largest audience to ever to witness an inauguration, period – both in person and around the globe". But as many sources immediately pointed out, that claim was false.

Spicer stated that the press had altered images of the event to minimize the size of the crowds. He said floor coverings over the grass were to blame for a visual effect that made the audience look smaller, and stated they had never been used before despite the fact that they had been used in 2013 for the preceding second inauguration of Barack Obama. He also used incorrect figures to claim that Metro ridership was higher during Trump's inauguration than during Obama's inauguration, when in fact it was lower than during either of Obama's inaugurations. Spicer took no questions after his statement. Later, Spicer defended his previous statements by saying "sometimes we can disagree with the facts". It was subsequently reported that Spicer had made the statement on direct orders from Trump, who was furious at what he considered unfair press coverage of his inauguration.

In response to the briefing, conservative political analyst Bill Kristol wrote: "It is embarrassing, as an American, to watch this briefing by Sean Spicer from the podium at the White House." Vanity Fair described Spicer's statement as "peppered with lies", and The Atlantic described Spicer's briefing as "bizarre". The article referred to the "Trump administration's needless lies" and noted that Spicer's statements appeared to involve a "deliberate attempt to mislead". Glenn Kessler of The Washington Post gave Spicer's claims four Pinocchios, writing that he was so appalled by the press secretary's performance that he wished he could have given him five Pinocchios instead of the maximum number of four.

Trump's team defended Spicer's statements. White House chief of staff Reince Priebus stated that the purpose of Spicer's conference was to call out what he called "dishonesty in the media" and their "obsession with delegitimizing the president". Trump's campaign strategist and counselor, Kellyanne Conway, told NBC's Chuck Todd that Trump's inauguration crowd numbers could not be proved nor quantified and that the press secretary was simply giving "alternative facts". Todd responded by saying, "Alternative facts are not facts. They are falsehoods."

=== First official press conference ===
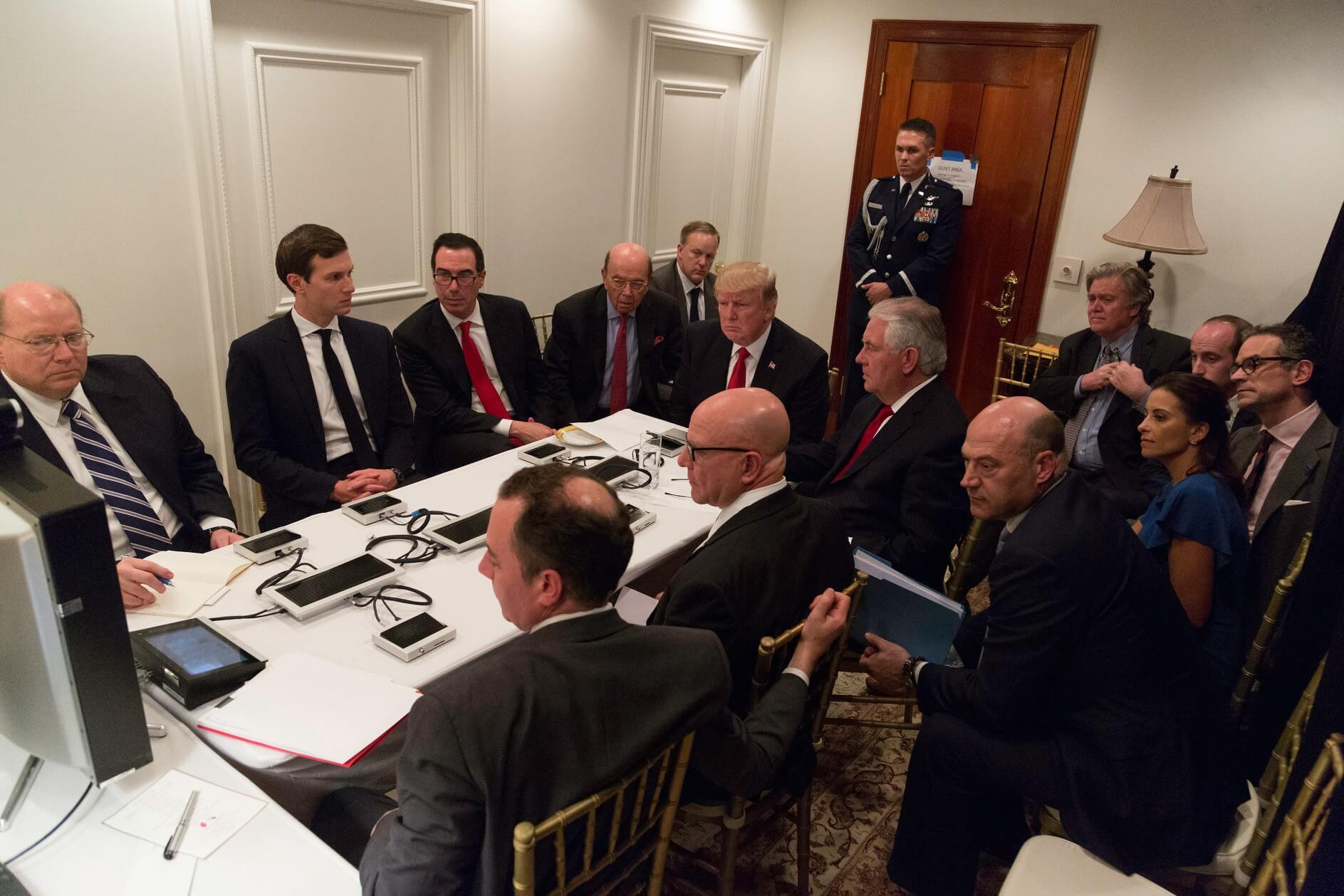
Spicer (behind Trump's shoulder in the corner) during the April 2017 Syrian missile strike operation

Two days later on January 23, 2017, Spicer held his first official White House press conference and took questions from reporters. When Spicer was asked about attendance at the inauguration, he said that his definition of a viewing audience also included individuals who watched the event on television as well as on social media online. He claimed that online viewership must have been in the "tens of millions".

Spicer's argument was based on the reported figure of 16.9 million people who began streaming the inauguration on CNN's website. This argument has been criticized because the 16.9 million streams included people who started the stream and then left.

On February 7, 2017, CNN reported that "President Donald Trump is disappointed in Spicer's performance during the first two weeks of the administration." Trump was also upset at White House chief of staff Reince Priebus for recommending Spicer, the network reported. Trump "regrets it every day and blames Priebus", a White House source told CNN. His role as temporary communications director was filled by Michael Dubke on March 6, 2017.

=== Hitler–Assad controversy ===
On April 11, 2017, Spicer issued a statement in reference to the Khan Shaykhun chemical attack. He said that Russia should not support the Syrian government and also commented that in World War II, "You had someone as despicable as Hitler who didn't even sink to using chemical weapons." Spicer also referred to concentration camps as "Holocaust centers", drawing more criticism.

His remarks were widely criticized, especially given the fact that the timing of the remarks coincided with the Jewish holiday of Passover. Spicer later clarified that he was not trying to deny that Hitler used lethal gas during the Holocaust, instead that he was trying to compare how Assad dropped bombs on population centers to how Hitler used the gas. Amid calls for his resignation, Spicer apologized the next day.

=== Relationship with White House press corps ===
As White House press secretary, Spicer had a contentious relationship with the White House press corps. In February 2017, the White House selectively blocked several news outlets – including the BBC, CNN, The New York Times, Los Angeles Times and Politico – from an off-camera briefing (or "gaggle") with Spicer, a move that prompted strong objections from the outlets concerned, as well as by the White House Correspondents' Association. The Washington Post wrote that the barring of the outlets was "a rare and surprising move that came amid President Trump's escalating war against the media." Reporters from the Associated Press and Time magazine were admitted to the briefing, but chose not to attend in protest of the exclusion of other journalists. In May 2017 Sarah Huckabee Sanders began to handle some key press briefings.

=== Defendant in Twitter lawsuit ===
On July 11, 2017, Spicer, along with Donald Trump, and Dan Scavino (the White House director of social media), was sued by the Knight First Amendment Institute at Columbia University in U.S. federal court in Manhattan. The suit, Knight First Amendment Institute v. Trump, alleges that Trump and the White House officials violated the First Amendment by blocking some users from accessing Trump's Twitter content.

=== Resignation ===
On July 21, 2017, Spicer announced his intention to resign as White House Press Secretary. He made his decision known immediately after President Trump appointed financier Anthony Scaramucci as White House communications director. In the weeks leading up to the resignation announcement, Spicer had sought "a more strategic communications role" in the White House. Trump had reportedly been dissatisfied for some time with Spicer's performance as White House Press Secretary. According to The New York Times, Trump asked Spicer to stay on, but Spicer announced his resignation after telling the President he "vehemently disagreed" with the appointment of Scaramucci. In a tweet, Spicer said that it has been "an honor and a privilege" to serve Trump and that he would continue his service in the White House, through August 2017. His new position was not identified. Sarah Sanders was announced as the new White House Press Secretary the same day.

== Post-White House activities ==
After several low-profile months, Spicer was reportedly refused contracts to be a paid contributor at any of the five major American TV news networks—ABC News, CBS News, CNN, Fox News, and NBC News—according to a number of anonymous sources, this was due to a "lack of credibility".

On September 17, 2017, Spicer made a cameo appearance at the 2017 Emmy Awards, spoofing his first press conference as Trump's press secretary by saying that the Emmys broadcast would garner "the largest audience to witness an Emmys, period". The following week he gave an interview to The New York Times and appeared on Good Morning America. Also, it was revealed that during his eight-month tenure at the White House he kept copious notes on what he did, saw, and heard, filling numerous notebooks. The revelation provoked speculation that the notebooks would be of interest to the investigation of special prosecutor Robert Mueller.

Spicer announced in December 2017 on The Sean Hannity Show that he would release a book, The Briefing: Politics, the Press, and the President, in July 2018 about his tenure with the Trump administration.

On July 31, 2019, President Trump announced his intention to appoint Spicer to be a Member of the Board of Visitors to the United States Naval Academy and later did so. On September 8, 2021, the White House Communications Director confirmed that President Joe Biden sought resignation letters from all 18 former military academy Presidential appointees placed in the final months of the prior administration, including Spicer, and those who refused would be terminated that evening. Spicer's federal lawsuit to challenge his firing from the naval academy board was dismissed in 2022 because "to insulate the plaintiffs from removal would raise serious constitutional issues, as Board members are executive officials..." and the statute governing the panel did not provide removal protections. This Biden-era legal win that allowed the president to fire certain board members set the stage for President Donald Trump to fire several people who sat on the Kennedy Center board.

In August 2019, Spicer was announced as a contestant on season 28 of Dancing with the Stars. This announcement was met with criticism on social media and by many at ABC News. One ABC employee told CNN journalist Oliver Darcy: "It's a slap in the face to those of us who had to deal with his baloney and the consequences of the ongoing lies and disinformation campaign at the White House." Spicer responded by saying that Dancing "is an entertainment show. I look forward to having some fun. And if people are looking for news, I suggest they tune into a news program". During the season premiere, Spicer wore a bright lime green shirt with ruffles while his dancing partner's dress prominently featured pineapples as they engaged in a salsa dance, garnering widespread media coverage.

In March 2020, Spicer started hosting a political talk show for the channel Newsmax TV called Spicer & Co. The show was cancelled in April 2023 when Spicer and his co-host Lyndsay Keith left Newsmax.

Following the 2021 storming of the United States Capitol, Forbes warned corporations against hiring Spicer and other Trump "propagandists", stating, "Forbes will assume that everything your company or firm talks about is a lie."

Spicer attended the farewell event for President Trump on January 20, 2021, at Joint Base Andrews.

Spicer currently serves as a political contributor for cable network NewsNation, a role he has held since 2023. Spicer is also the co-host of the daily podcast The Morning Meeting with Mark Halperin and Dan Turrentine on the 2WAY Network.

== Personal life ==
On November 13, 2004, Spicer married Rebecca Miller, at the time a television producer, at St. Alban's Episcopal Church in Washington, D.C. Spicer and his wife live in Alexandria, Virginia. They have two children. His wife is senior vice president, communications and public affairs, for the National Beer Wholesalers Association. He is Roman Catholic.

== In popular culture ==
Melissa McCarthy as Sean Spicer podiums on an NYC street, May 12, 2017

Several commentators have compared Spicer to "Baghdad Bob", Information Minister under Iraqi President Saddam Hussein.

Spicer's frequently combative press conferences were satirized four times on Saturday Night Live in 2017, with actress Melissa McCarthy playing the role of Spicer. Her portrayal was described by a staff writer at The Atlantic as "genius", mixing "energy and weaponized hostility". Spicer stated that he found the sketches funny, but suggested that McCarthy "could dial back" a bit. He also portrayed a fictionalized version of himself in Army of the Dead along with Donna Brazile.

== See also ==
- White House Fellows

Political offices
Preceded by Josh Earnest	White House Press Secretary; 2017	Succeeded by Sarah Huckabee Sanders
Preceded by Jen Psaki	White House Director of Communications; Acting; 2017	Succeeded by Mike Dubke
Preceded by Mike Dubke	White House Director of Communications; Acting; 2017	Succeeded by Anthony Scaramucci
