= Vicky Ward =

British investigative journalist

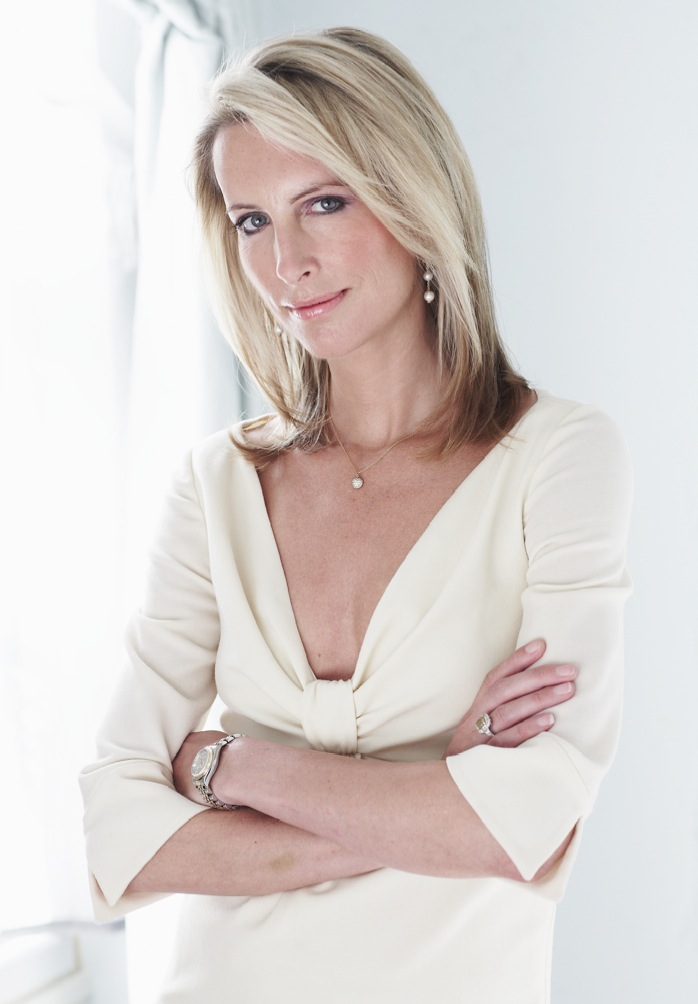
- Ward in 2010
- Born: Victoria Penelope Jane Ward; 3 July 1969 (age 57); Chelmsford, England
- Citizenship: United States
- Education: Trinity Hall, Cambridge (BA, MA)
- Occupations: Investigative journalist; author; editor; TV commentator
- Employer: CNN
- Spouse: Matthew Doull (m. 1995; div. 2010)

Victoria Penelope Jane Ward (born 3 July 1969) is a British-born author, investigative journalist, editor, and television commentator. She was a Senior Reporter at CNN, and a former magazine and newspaper editor who has featured in The New York Times Best Seller list.

== Early life and education ==
Ward was born Victoria Penelope Jane Ward on 3 July 1969, the daughter of Simon Charles Ward, and Jillian Ward (née East). Ward attended Benenden School and later earned a BA and MA in English literature from Trinity Hall, Cambridge.

== Journalism career ==
Before moving to the United States, Ward worked as a columnist and feature writer for The Independent. Ward moved to New York City in 1997, where she worked at the New York Post and was the executive editor at Talk. Throughout the 2000s, she wrote investigative stories for Vanity Fair on topics such as Hewlett Packard and its CEO Carly Fiorina, Catherine Middleton, and a profile of Jeffrey Epstein.

Ward worked as a contributing editor to Vanity Fair as well as a columnist for the London Evening Standard. In 2010, she published her first book, The Devil's Casino, on the downfall of Lehman Brothers.

As a journalist, Ward has contributed to a variety of publications in the United States and the United Kingdom, such as the Financial Times, The New York Times, Esquire, the London Times, The Daily Telegraph, The Spectator, and British Vogue. She has worked as the editor-at-large for Town & Country magazine.

In July 2017, Ward became editor-at-large for HuffPost and Huffington Post Highline, where she wrote features on individuals including Erik Prince, Michael Cohen, Anthony Scaramucci, among others.

In 2015, Ward said her 2003 profile of Jeffrey Epstein in Vanity Fair had included on-the-record accounts of Annie and Maria Farmer (who filed the earliest known criminal complaints about Epstein), but that they were later stricken from Ward's article after Epstein pressured the magazine's editor Graydon Carter. While researching Epstein, Ward was pregnant with twins and reported that she felt compelled to hire security protection for their neonatal intensive care unit after Epstein had threatened their wellbeing. In 2019, Ward published Kushner, Inc., a book about Jared Kushner and Ivanka Trump.

In July 2019, Ward was named Senior Reporter at CNN. She joined the Council on Foreign Relations in June 2020, and in September 2023 she was named a Visiting Fellow at the University of Oxford.

In 2025, Ward and James Patterson published their book The Idaho Four: An American Tragedy. In August 2025, Ward and Patterson announced their collaboration on an upcoming book about the killing of Brian Thompson, the CEO of UnitedHealth. The book is planned to be published by Little, Brown and Company. No title or release date was given.

== Personal life ==
Ward married Matthew Doull in 1995. Ward and Doull later divorced, an experience she wrote about in the Daily Mail. Ward became a naturalized U.S. citizen in 2017.

In 2011, a portrait of Ward by the photographer Jason Bell was exhibited in the British National Portrait Gallery as part of Bell's series An Englishman in New York.

== Publications ==
=== Books ===
- Ward, Vicky (2010). The Devil's Casino: Friendship, Betrayal and the High Stakes Games Played Inside Lehman Brothers. Wiley. ISBN 978-0-470-54086-2.
- — (2014). The Liar's Ball: The Extraordinary Saga of How one Building Broke the World's Toughest Tycoons. Wiley. ISBN 978-1-118-29531-1.
- — (2019). Kushner, Inc.: Greed. Ambition. Corruption. The Extraordinary Story of Jared Kushner and Ivanka Trump. New York: St. Martin's Press. ISBN 978-1-250-18595-2.
- —; Patterson, James (2025). The Idaho Four: An American Tragedy. Little, Brown and Company. ISBN 978-0-316-57285-9.

=== Selected articles ===
- Ward, Vicky (June 2002). "The Battle For Hewlett-Packard". Vanity Fair.
- — (March 2003). "The Talented Mr. Epstein". Vanity Fair.
- — (November 2008). "Will's Cup of Tea". Vanity Fair.
