= The Briefing: Politics, the Press, and the President =

Book by Sean Spicer

- First edition (UK)
- Author: Sean Spicer
- Publisher: Biteback Publishing (UK); Regnery Publishing (US)
- ISBN: 978-1-62157-814-7 (Hardcover)

The Briefing: Politics, the Press, and the President is a 2018 book by former White House Press Secretary Sean Spicer.
