= Kate Germano =

- Notable work: Fight Like a Girl

Kate Germano is an American author and a former lieutenant colonel in the United States Marine Corps.

Germano is known for her 2018 book Fight Like a Girl, which explores systemic gender bias against women in the U.S. Marine Corps' recruiting and training policies.

== Life ==
Germano graduated from the U.S. Marine Corps Command and Staff College. She served 20 years in the Marines. In 2015, she was relieved of command after she challenged Marine Corps leadership about proven systemic gender bias in the recruiting and training of women. She is the former chief operations officer of the Service Women's Action Network. In 2016, Germano founded Cassandra-Helenus Partners, LLC, an executive coaching and change leadership consulting firm. Since Germano retired from the Marines, the Marine Corps has relented and implemented some of her then-controversial training methods. On June 15, 2023, the Marine Corps finally acted in accordance with Germano's recommendations, deactivated the segregated 4th Recruit Training Battalion, and fully integrated recruit training.

== Works ==
External videos
- After Words interview with Germano on Fight Like a Girl, August 18, 2018, C-SPAN

- Fight like a Girl Amherst, New York : Prometheus Books, 2018. ISBN 9781633884137, OCLC 993645207
