= History of commercial tobacco in the United States =

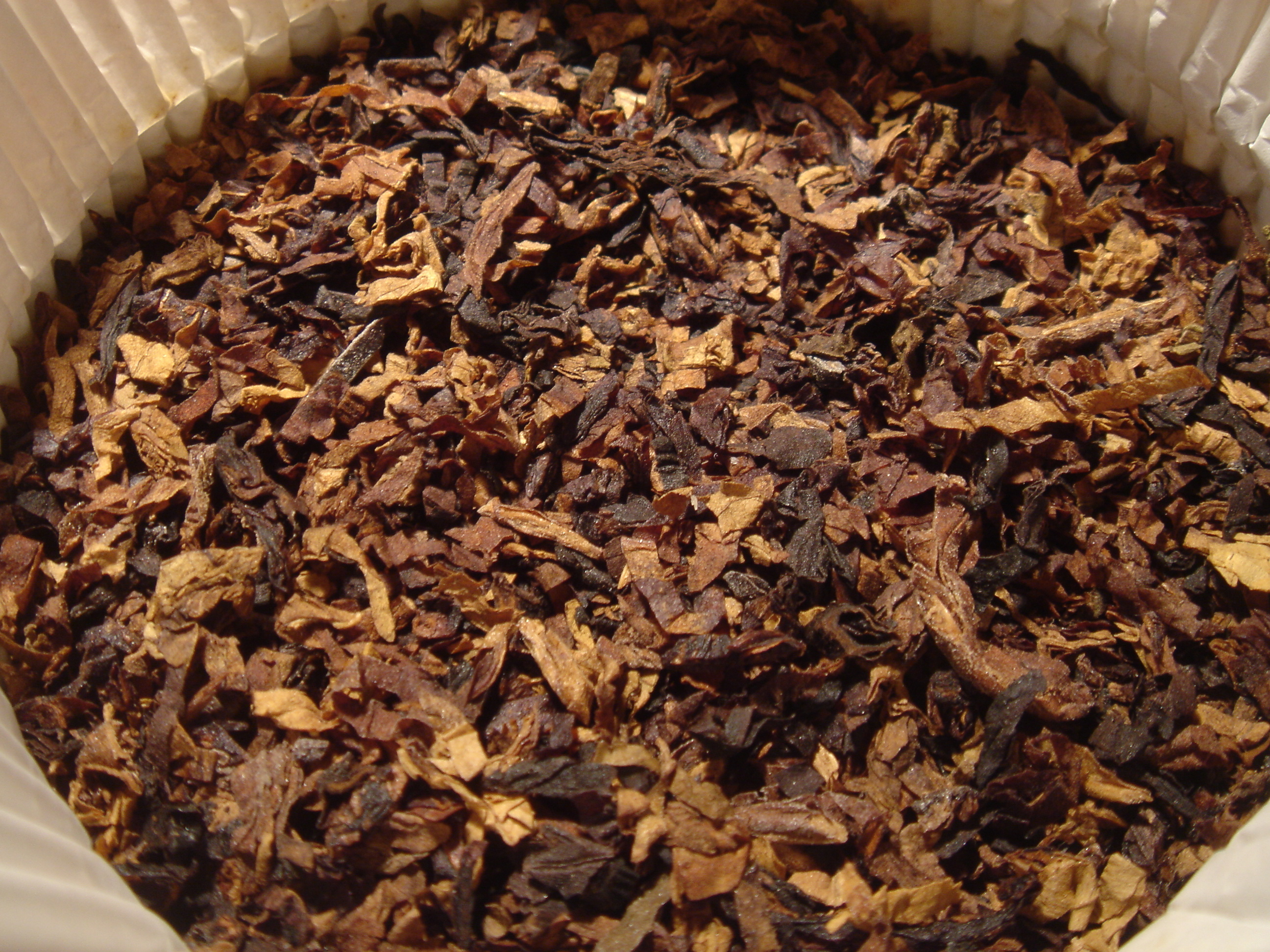
Shredded tobacco leaf for pipe smoking

The history of commercial tobacco production in the United States dates back to the 17th century when the first commercial crop was planted. The industry originated in the production of tobacco for British pipes and snuff. See Tobacco in the American colonies. In late 18th century there was an increase in demand for tobacco in the United States, where the demand for tobacco in the form of cigars and chewing tobacco increased. In the late 19th century production shifted to the manufactured cigarette.

== Pre-American Revolution ==
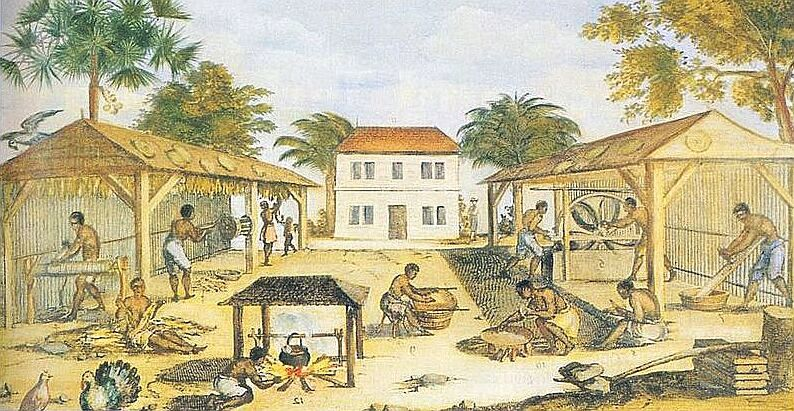
This 1670 painting shows enslaved Africans working in the tobacco sheds of a colonial tobacco plantation

Throughout the 17th century, Europe had a growing demand for tobacco. However, in areas of the American south, where tobacco grew well, capital was needed in order to grow this highly demanding crop. These farmers saw tobacco as merely a temporary crop to get them started until they could plant something else. Their reasoning behind the temporary status given to tobacco had to do with low prices. During the 17th century in Virginia, tobacco was selling for pennies per pound. Solutions to this problem came with slavery. Slavery had already existed in the colonies, but a new influx would greatly expand tobacco production.

The need for slaves was a response to low birth rates of the European settlers in America. Slavery would help keep costs down and profits higher. Slavery would mark a change from small tobacco farms, to larger farms, which necessitated large labour forces provided by the slaves. These large tobacco farms, accounted for a small part of the overall production of agriculture in the colonies leading into the later part of the 17th century, as tobacco had already begun to fail in less fertile regions of the country. This failure was due to lack of crop rotation, which depleted the soil of the nutrients needed by the tobacco plants. Those who created large plantations in the more fertile regions, however, saw great prosperity, even at the low price per pound of tobacco. This prosperity in turn helped to make them richer and able to purchase even more slaves which helped these large farms to continuously expand.

Into the late 17th century, however, farmers in the Caribbean islands had the same ideas of creating large farms with the use of slaves. Most slaves were not treated as animals, though, for the farmer it would have cost them more money than needed to replace a slave than to keep the ones already owned alive. In comparison, however, even in the Caribbean, the slaves working on tobacco were treated somewhat more fairly than those on sugar plantations whereas the slaves growing tobacco on the islands had often come from regions in Africa that grew tobacco and as such had an appreciated knowledge for the planting and harvesting of tobacco. However, this is not to say they were treated equally.

Slavery was an important part of the process of growing tobacco, especially in the American colonies. The use of slaves kept the cost down in general. But with successive generations of slaves born to past generations, slave masters gained new employees at little or no cost. This fact is proven by a trend toward low immigration of African slaves, while there was still an increase in African population in the colonies. However, issues still ensued with taxation by Britain. In the mid-1770s taxes blossomed to 300,000 pounds sterling per year for exportation of tobacco alone.

In 1735, John Cockburn published an excerpt on the use of ceegars (cigars) in Spanish colonies. This publication helped support the sale of tobacco goods. Although for a time in Britain and other European countries like Germany, "smoking" tobacco was frowned upon, it would find its favor eventually amongst society who, up to this time, took tobacco mainly as "snuff." Although tobacco began to find favor amongst certain societies, the American Revolution would become a temporary setback for some, and a permanent one for others.

== American Revolution ==
The American Revolution would have profound effects upon the social and economic stability of the colonies. With a temporary lapse in tobacco exports to Europe, even more small farmers found themselves switching over to crops other than tobacco. In South Carolina, there was a shift toward rice plantations; while in other areas other sorts of much needed vegetation was grown for sustenance of the nation. Another issue that arose with the blockade of tobacco from the American colonies was a shift toward British use of Turkish and Egyptian tobacco. As part of the British disdain for American independence, the British seized and destroyed over 10,000 hogsheads of tobacco in 1780–1781. Led by generals Phillips, Arnold and Cornwallis, this attack on the American tobacco industry is sometimes entitled the "Tobacco War" by historians.

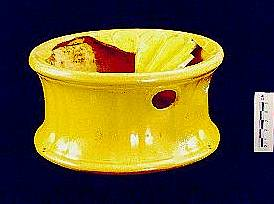
A simple U.S.-made spittoon of yellow ware

Many other countries were blockaded from trading with the American colonies during the American Revolution and, as such, turned to other resources for their tobacco. Many of these other countries never resumed trade with the newly formed United States so this portion of trade was permanently lost. What did grow, however, was the consumption of tobacco in the United States and a new desire for tobacco grew in Germany and Russia post Revolution. American tobacco customs began to switch from the earlier pipe smoke to the cigar as mentioned earlier, as well as the great American western icon of the spittoon, which was linked to chewing tobacco. These latter two were considered a more coarse form of taking tobacco and, as such, were deemed very "American" in nature by Europeans as spitting was a trait attributed to their usage. Americans also enjoyed the flavor of island tobacco more, but since many smokers in the USA were not wealthy, working farmers took to smoking tobacco grown from their own land. This may also have come more from the American desire to be independent, not only in a legal sense by being a free-nation, but economically as well.

== Introduction of the cigarette ==
The lower class French men that served in the French military gained a liking for tobacco during the War of 1812. Having occupied Andalusia (Spain) they even got to see what would become the future of the American tobacco industry. Known in Andalusia as "tabaco picado," (minced tobacco), this style of tobacco was relegated to the poor class in the conquered region, so the French did not take up to smoking it in mass at this time. Eventually it would prove popular even in France. The rural poor smoked the minced tobacco, wrapped in maize husks, but the upper class of Andalusia urban areas would wrap the tobacco in paper. The paper-wrapping trend was short-lived at the time however, because the Spanish government outlawed "white tobacco" in 1801 as some were smuggling tobacco illegally, labeling the contents as different substances that did not require taxation.

By the end of the 18th century, a renewed interest in tobacco took hold. In turn, this meant more demand for tobacco from America again, and this meant a boom in increased slavery in the southern United States where tobacco was grown. Post American Revolution, tobacco skyrocketed in price. Wartime had a huge influence over the price of tobacco because, just prior to the Revolution, there was a small peak in price during the Seven Years' War when different cultures gained a desire for tobacco after fighting opponents who had been smoking it.

The demand had increased so much after 1776, that many farmers were unable to meet the demands for exports, which increased the prices of tobacco even further. With a desire to increase the amount of tobacco available, many American farmers took out credit loans from the British to increase the size of their landholdings as well as increase the number of slaves they owned. Much of this credit went to gentleman farmers, but the desire for tobacco was so strong that even middle class farmers found it easy to receive loans to increase their farm production. Many of these farmers opted not to pay back these loans however, and many in turn found themselves jailed toward the end of the century for not paying their debts. Many of these debtors were small farmers, causing a further consolidation of smaller farms into larger ones.

== Cigarettes go mainstream ==
A significant change began in the establishment of Victorian society in Europe. In an attempt to civilize anything that seemed coarse or uncivil, much of Victorian society would adapt cultural items to suit their tastes. The British adopted the paper wrapped minced tobacco. Such an item, originally relegated to the poor in Spain, seemed at face value a contradiction; however, one must consider the need for human manipulation of tobacco, including, chopping it up, wrapping it in a man-made piece of paper, and then inserting it into a piece of cane for a mouth piece. One can then see that this was just another way of civilizing part of the coarser aspects of the British Empire. A feministic culture dominated smoking at this time as well as much tobacco, giving further rise to this "dainty" cigarette, bearing a feminine name.

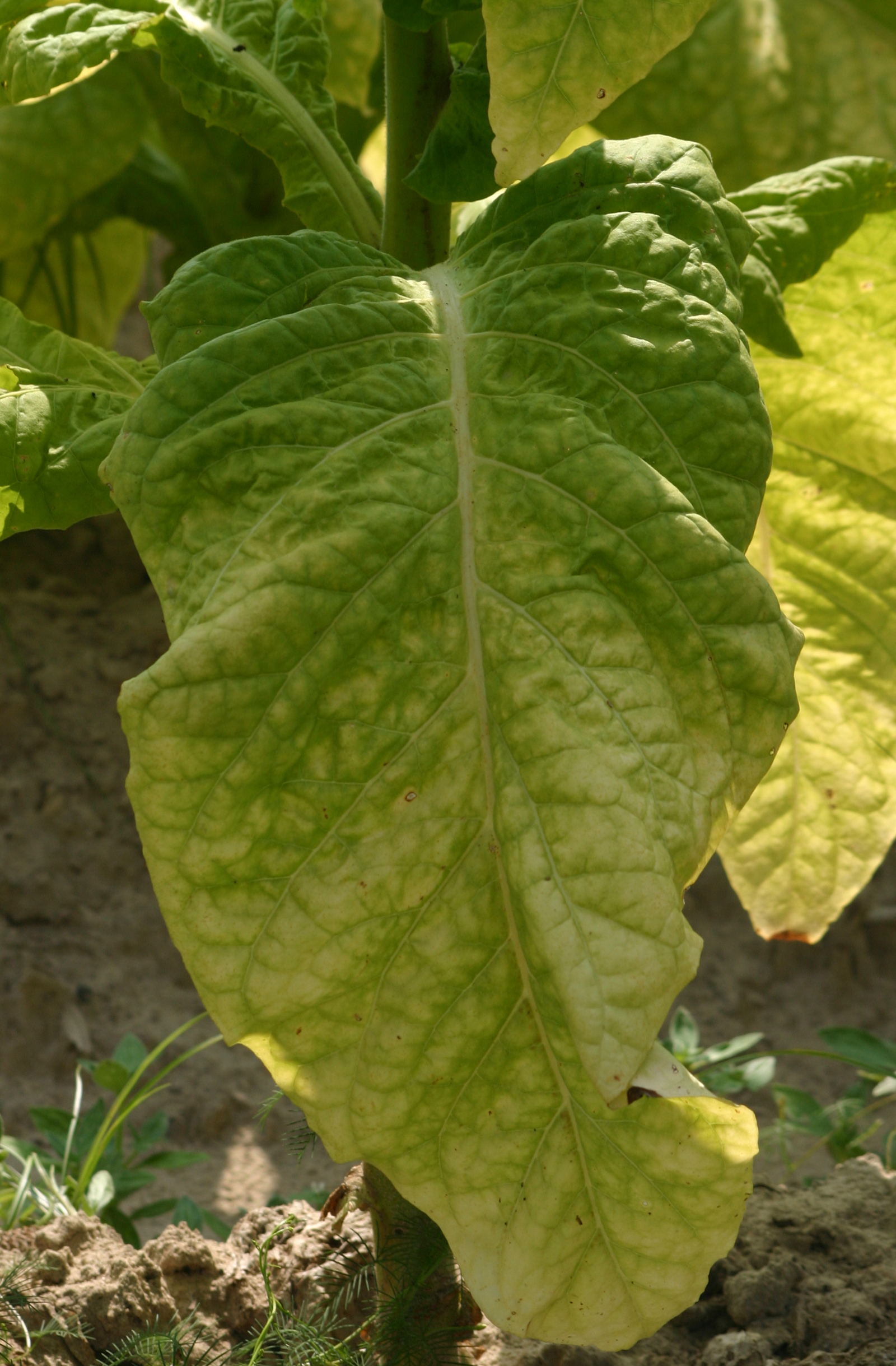
Brightleaf tobacco ready to be cured

It is a false myth that a slave named Stephan discovered how to cure the leaf, according to Drew Sawnson. Instead bright tobacco was the historical product of decades of experimentation with various curing methods, seed varieties and soil types. The farmers realized that consumers would pay more for the sweeter and more aromatic qualities of the bright yellow leaf. Their efforts showed that the sandy, nitrogen-poor soil of the Piedmont region in south central Virginia and neighboring North Carolina worked best for creating the mild flavor tobacco chewers craved to the point of addiction. The solution included new methods of curing the Bright Leaf tobacco variety (a lighter flavored tobacco leaf) with charcoal taken from a local blacksmith's fire rather than the usual logwood. This fire burned hotter and faster and accelerated the curing process. The process was refined further to include a furnace in which heat from the charcoal was applied through flues, so that dark soot and off flavors did not come in contact with the tobacco. This changed the curing process of a lighter leaf and produced a new, lighter tobacco which was able to be inhaled. This, linked together with the European taste for cigarettes, led to an emerging export market.

Emancipation during the American Civil War freed the entire slave workforce of the American South. Although some slaves stayed on for pay with their prior slave owners, many left entirely to make their own lives. Tobacco farmers needed to adapt. Not only had they lost their workforce, but also a shift in demand had occurred. In Europe, there was a desire for not only snuff, pipes and cigars, but cigarettes appeared as well. Cigar rolling and even the creation of pipe tobacco at the time was labor-intensive and, without slave labor, innovation needed to occur.

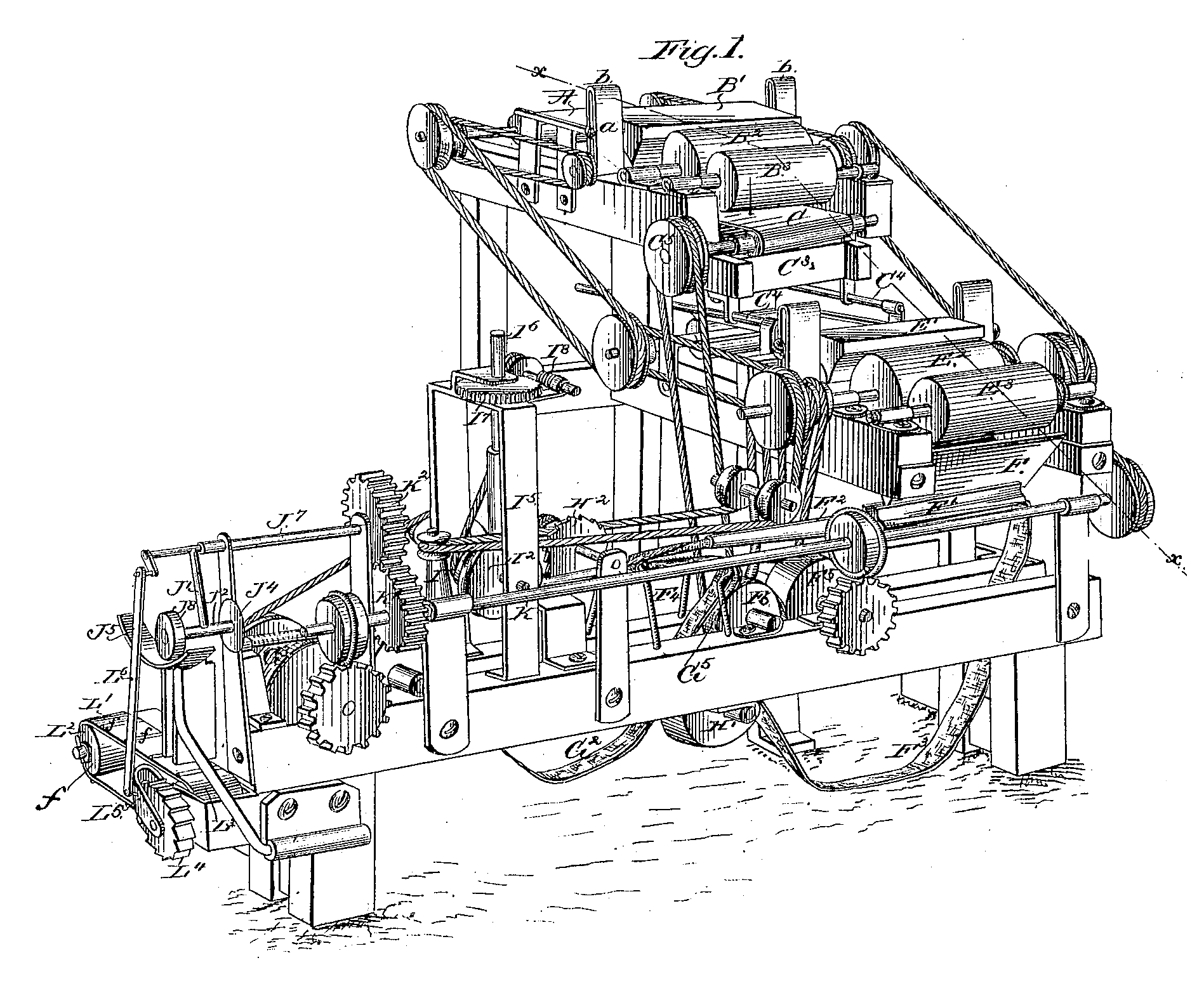
Bonsack's cigarette rolling machine, as shown on U.S. patent 238,640.

Those farmers that did not go out of business consolidated their holdings with land from other farmers, who now had no workforce. The answer to the labor problem came from the cigarette. The quality of the tobacco, although still considered, did not have to be perfect as it would be minced to be wrapped into paper. The next step to limiting labor was the process of creating the cigarette. During the 1870s a machine was invented by Albert Pease of Dayton, Ohio, which chopped up the tobacco for cigarettes. Up until the 1880s, cigarettes were still made by hand and were high in price. In 1881, James Bonsack, an avid craftsman, created a machine that revolutionized cigarette production. The machine chopped the tobacco, then dropped a certain amount of the tobacco into a long tube of paper, which the machine would then roll and push out the end where it would be sliced by the machine into individual cigarettes. This machine operated at thirteen times the speed of a human cigarette roller.

The tobacco industry began advertising the now inexpensive cigarettes at home and in Europe. Many other forms of tobacco quickly lost popularity as men switched to easy to inhale cigarettes. Sales of cigarettes grew astronomically. The main producer was American Tobacco Co., which consolidated many small companies into a monopoly of every form except cigars. Its sales were $25,000,000 in 1890, and $316,000,000 in 1903. After the Civil War government debts were paid off, taxes were almost completely removed from cigarettes. It was at this point, that the cigarette became an integral part of American culture, which lasted until scientific discoveries revealed the health consequences of smoking.

Cigarette smoking in the U.S. has declined by about two-thirds over the past half-century.

Women became a major target in the early 20th century in a process that was quite similar in Canada. The consumption of cigarettes in Canada began to rise in the early 20th century. According to Sharon Cook:

The pathfinders who first articulated women’s right to smoke were members of the middle and upper classes who were “untrammelled by conventional notions of decorum” for women, such as actresses, intellectuals, and “new women.” After all, these were the leaders of the 19th- and early 20th-century enfranchisement campaigns and other public-sphere campaigns which demanded the right to enter the professions, hold membership in artistic associations, and much else. It is not surprising that early examples of women pushing the boundaries of acceptable behaviors like smoking were women of privilege—intellectuals, artists, society women, and the like. The same process was at work in the masculine world of smoking with elitist elements arguing first for snuff, then cigars, pipes, and finally cigarettes.

Cook argues that the tobacco companies were looking for large profits which depended on sales to a much larger base of working women. They pitched their advertising to them, not to the elite. Thus, "The combination of cheap prices, reliable and theatrical possibilities as a wardrobe prop, [short] duration of the smoking experience and workplace norms of peer associations...explain cigarettes’ growing popularity over cigars and pipes for working women after World War I."

== See also ==
- List of tobacco-related topics
- Cigarette
- Dipping tobacco
- Tobacco industry
- Tobacco smoking
- Types of tobacco
