= Jonathan Alter =

American journalist, author, documentary filmmaker, and television producer

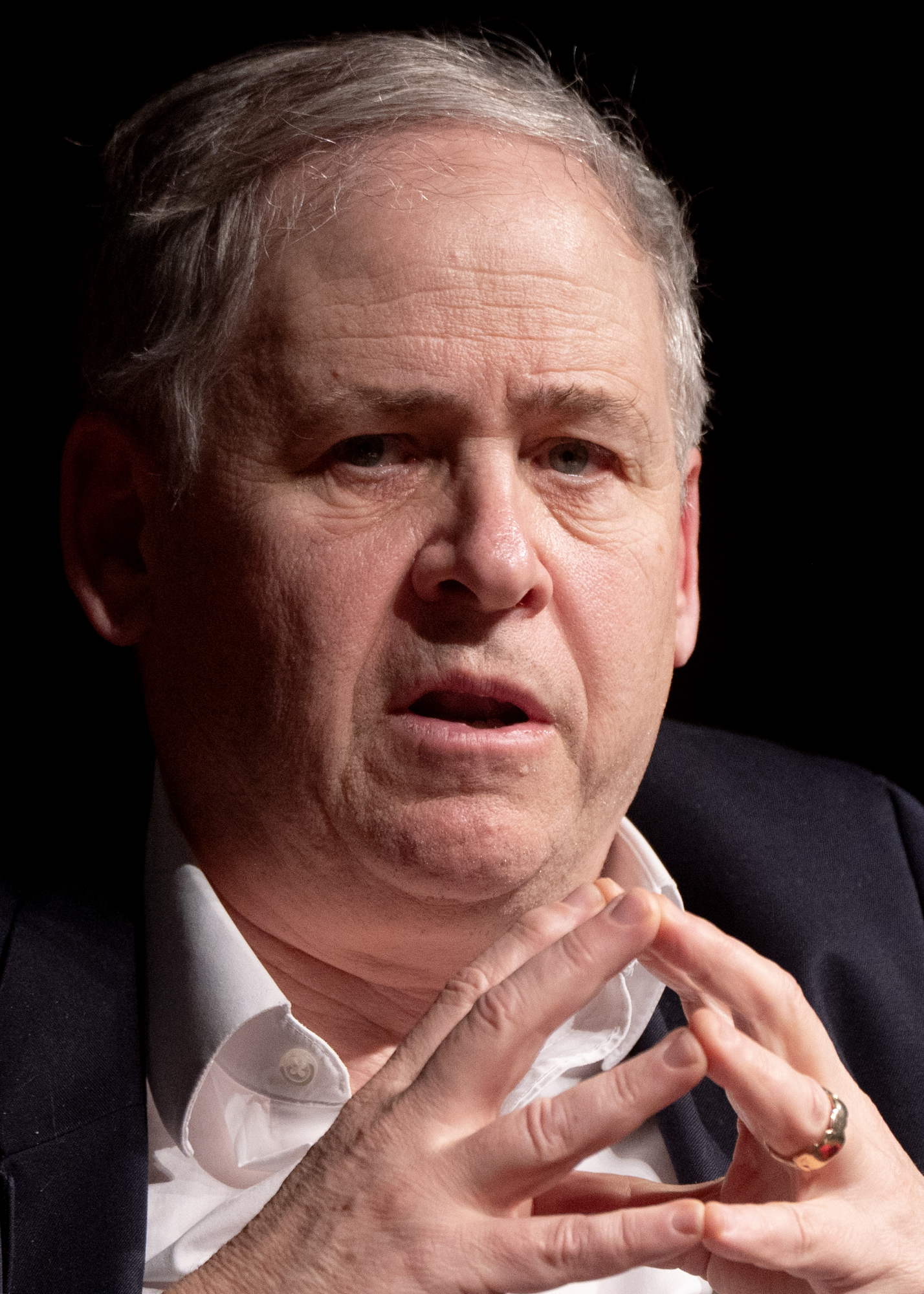
- Jonathan Alter (2025)
- Born: Jonathan H. Alter; October 6, 1957 (age 68); Chicago, Illinois, U.S.
- Education: Harvard University
- Occupations: Journalist; author
- Spouse: Emily Lazar (m. 1986)
- Children: Charlotte, Molly, Tommy
- Parent: Joanne Alter (mother)
- Writing career
- Genres: Non-fiction; American political history
- Website: www.jonathanalter.com

Jonathan H. Alter is an American author, political analyst, columnist, documentary filmmaker, and television producer. He served as a columnist and senior editor for Newsweek magazine from 1983 to 2011. Alter has written extensively on American politics and history, including several books about U.S. presidents.

Alter is a political analyst for NBC News and since 1996, has appeared on NBC, MSNBC, and CNBC. He has a site on the internet. In 2021, Alter launched a newsletter entitled "Old Goats with Jonathan Alter", where he posts columns, videos, and interviews with accomplished people who may share their wisdom and experience. His newsletter is published as free and paid via Substack. In 2013 and 2014, Alter served as an executive producer on the Amazon Studios production entitled Alpha House that starred John Goodman, Mark Consuelos, Clark Johnson, and Matt Malloy. In 2019, he co-produced and co-directed Breslin and Hamill: Deadline Artists, a documentary about the columnists Jimmy Breslin and Pete Hamill that received the 2020 Emmy Award for Outstanding Historical Documentary.

Books by Alter include The Center Holds: Obama and His Enemies (2013), The Promise: President Obama, Year One (2010), which went to number three on the New York Times Bestsellers List, Between The Lines: A View Inside American Politics, People and Culture (2008), and The Defining Moment: FDR's Hundred Days and the Triumph of Hope (2006), a New York Times Notable Book of the Year. His 2024 book, American Reckoning: Inside Trump's Trial - And My Own, recounts his eyewitness account of the landmark criminal trial that was neither televised nor videoed in which Donald Trump was convicted of 37 felonies .

From 2015 to 2023, Alter hosted a radio show with his children, "Alter Family Politics", as part of Andy Cohen's 24-hour network, Radio Andy, Channel 102 on Sirius XM.

In 2021, Alter began an online Substack publication for free and paid subscribers entitled, Old Goats with Jonathan Alter, that he characterizes as "ruminating with friends". In 2025, Alter and historian Julian Zelizer also launched a similar free and paid internet newsletter entitled "Then and Now" via Substack, where they compare a current event with similar historical circumstances that may be discussed and provide insights in a few minutes.

== Early life and education ==
Alter was raised in a Jewish family in Chicago, the son of James Alter (1922–2014), who owned a refrigeration and air-conditioning company, and Joanne (née Hammerman) (1927–2008), who was an elected commissioner of the Metropolitan Sanitary District of Greater Chicago and a member of the Democratic National Committee. His mother was the first woman in the Chicago area to be elected to public office. He is a 1975 graduate of Phillips Academy and a 1979 graduate of Harvard University, where he was one of the lead editors on the Harvard Crimson.

== Career ==
In the 1980s, Alter was the media critic for Newsweek. He launched a political commentary column with Newsweek in 1991 that was the first of its kind for the magazine. Alter became one of the few reporters with regular access to Bill Clinton after his election as president in 1992, during which time Alter was a consultant to MTV. In the book Media Circus (ISBN 0-8129-2022-8) by Howard Kurtz of The Washington Post, Clinton was quoted as saying, "Alter bites me in the ass sometimes, but at least he knows what we're trying to do".

Alter was the first pundit to predict the months-long recount process following the 2000 presidential election. His correct prediction, made during a discussion on NBC with Tim Russert and Tom Brokaw, gained international recognition for Alter.

Although Alter later asserted in his book Between the Lines that he regretted writing the article, in the aftermath of the September 11th attacks he authored an article for Newsweek about dealing with terrorists that was entitled "Time to think about torture". In the article he suggested that U.S. law enforcement might need to rethink some old assumptions about torture methodology, noting that "some torture clearly works" and suggested that the nation should "keep an open mind about certain measures to fight terrorism, like court-sanctioned psychological interrogation", and consideration of transferring some terrorists to other countries with less stringent rules on torture.

Alter frequently criticized President George W. Bush, emphasizing what he considered Bush's lack of accountability. Having benefited from an autologous adult stem cell transplant while fighting lymphoma, Alter also disparaged Bush's position on embryonic stem cell research. However, Alter offered some support for Bush's invasion of Iraq, writing in February 2003, "Osama Bin Laden hit us on 9/11 because he thought we were soft and would not respond. Weakness now would further embolden Saddam Hussein".

Alter served as a correspondent on the NBC Today Show for several stories about the effect of the Iraq War on returning veterans.

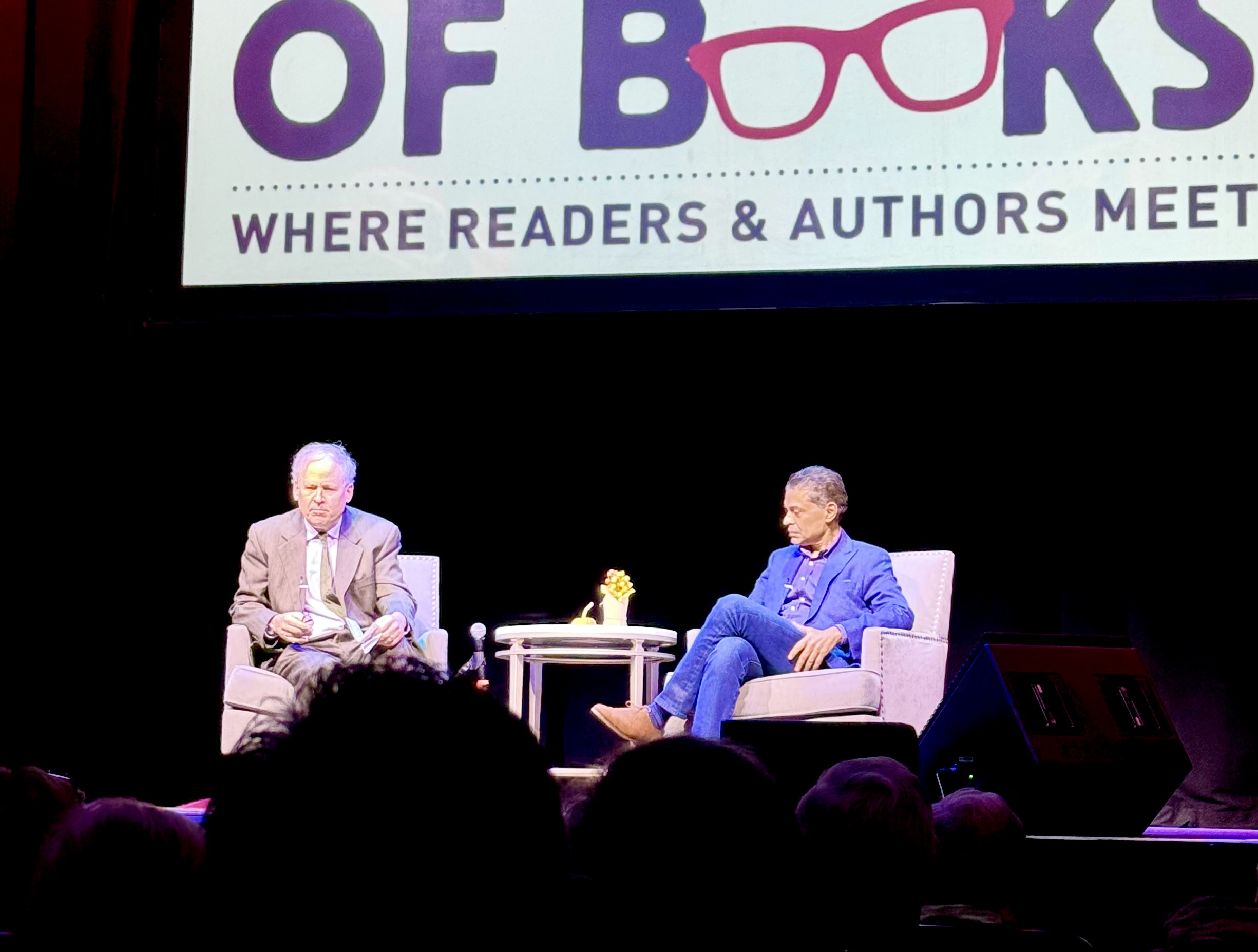
Alter and Fareed Zakaria (right) at the keynote 2024 event of the Morristown Festival of Books in New Jersey

Alter's 2006 book The Defining Moment concluded, to the surprise of some critics, that the United States had come very close to dictatorship before Franklin D. Roosevelt became president, painting FDR as the savior of American democracy and capitalism. The work gained acclaim from presidential candidates. During an interview with 60 Minutes on November 14, 2008, then-president-elect Barack Obama said he had recently been reading The Defining Moment and hoped to apply some of Roosevelt's strategies that were outlined in the book into his own administration. In 2020, then-president-elect Joe Biden said that he was learning about the fragility of democracy from The Defining Moment. As of 2025, for three times, Alter has been a best selling author on the list published by the New York Times.

A longtime proponent of education reform, Alter played a major role in the Academy Award-nominated documentary Waiting for "Superman". He also sits on the board of directors of The 74, an education news website.

Alter was the commencement speaker at Utica University in 2008. Again, in 2009, he was invited to be the speaker at the commencement at Western Connecticut State University when they awarded him an honorary doctorate. He also has received honorary degrees from Montclair State University (2009) and William Paterson University (2019).

Alter has held professional positions at several institutions. In 1993, Alter was a fellow of The Japan Society. He was the Ferris Visiting Professor at Princeton University. In 2009, he was a visiting professor at Arizona State University. In 2016, Alter was an adjunct professor at Montclair State University. He was awarded a John Simon Guggenheim Fellowship in 2024. He was named a visiting scholar at the American Academy in Rome in 2025.

In April 2011, Alter left Newsweek, quickly joining the media outlet Bloomberg. Following Bloomberg, he wrote for The New Yorker, The Daily Beast, Vanity Fair, Washington Monthly, and other publications. In 2024, he was a contributing opinion writer for The New York Times, assigned to write about the Trump felony trial and his 2024 presidential campaign.

Alter was an executive producer of the Amazon Studios show Alpha House, starring John Goodman. Written by Doonesbury creator Garry Trudeau, the comedy series revolves around four Republican U.S. senators who live together in a townhouse on Capitol Hill in Washington, D.C. After developing the script with Trudeau, Alter sold the pilot to Amazon, which picked up the show as its first original series. The show ran for two seasons, with a total of 21 episodes.

The 2019 HBO film Breslin and Hamill: Deadline Artists was co-produced and co-directed by Alter, with Steve McCarthy and John Block. The documentary was the winner of the 2020 Emmy Award for Outstanding Historical Documentary. It remains available on HBO Max.

Alter has interviewed nine of the past ten presidents of the United States.

== Personal life ==
Alter lives in Montclair, New Jersey, with his wife, Emily Lazar, a former executive producer of the Comedy Central show The Colbert Report, and The Late Show with Stephen Colbert. She is a longtime television news talent producer.

The couple's three children are: Charlotte (born 1989), a senior national correspondent for Time magazine; Tommy (born 1991), an Emmy-winning producer and co-founder with JJ Redick of ThreeFourTwo Productions, where he hosts the hit basketball podcast The Young Man and the Three; and Molly (born 1993), a partner in Northzone, who was selected as one of Forbes 30 Under 30 in venture capital in 2020.

Alter's family has had wide-ranging influence in politics. His mother, Joanne, was the first woman elected to public office in Cook County, Illinois. His sister, Jamie Alter Lynton, who also is a journalist and his brother-in-law Michael Lynton, the former CEO of Sony Corporation of America, were two of the most politically active Obama fundraisers in California. His cousin, Charles Rivkin, is a creator of the Muppets franchise, a former United States Ambassador to France, and the chairman of the Motion Picture Association of America (MPAA). Another cousin, Robert S. Rivkin, is a former deputy mayor of Chicago. Rivkin's wife Cindy S. Moelis is the former head of the White House Fellows Program and is among the closest friends of former First Lady of the United States Michelle Obama.

Alter is a former member of the board of directors of DonorsChoose, which allows teachers to post online proposals for classroom materials. He is a current board member of The Blue Card, a national Jewish organization assisting Holocaust survivors, the Century Foundation, and the Bone Marrow Foundation. He chairs the board of the J. Anthony Lukas Prize Project, which offers awards for non-fiction authors.
