= John Block (filmmaker) =

American documentary filmmaker

- Born: John Simeon Block; 1951; Chicago, IL, U.S.
- Occupation: filmmaker

John Simeon Block is an American documentary filmmaker.

== Career ==
John Block, a native of Chicago, is a 1972 graduate from Northwestern University. In 1977 he obtained a Master of Fine Arts in filmmaking from the New York University. From 1980 until 1983 he worked for WCBS and then came to NBC in 1983. Initially he was a "Special Segment" producer for the NBC Nightly News with Tom Brokaw. In 1990 he became a producer/writer for Real Life with Jane Pauley and in 1991 a producer/writer for the Brokaw Reports. From 1992 until 2009 Block was a producer/writer for Dateline NBC.

Since 2010, Block has been an independent producer and filmmaker.

Block's subjects cover a wide spectrum of social issues and problems including poverty, homelessness, medical issues, broken families, drugs, crime, and education. He has also made videos for educational and medical support programs.

== Personal life ==
Block resides in Montclair, New Jersey with his wife Maria. They have three children.

== Awards ==
- 1981 Guggenheim Fellowship
- 10 nominations and 3 Emmy Awards

== Selected filmography ==
- The Sixth Week (1978), "Best Documentary", Student Academy Awards of the Academy of Motion Pictures
- 1981-82 Daytime National Emmy for work on children series
- Class Photo (1995), Dateline NBC, a documentary about the fate of 21 of 25 Afro-American youths from Bedford-Stuyvesant twelve years after their fourth-grade class picture, duPont-Columbia Award
- Miracle on the Hudson (2007), at Dateline NBC documentary, Emmy Award
- New Orleans Rising (2010), a CNN documentary
- Different is the New Normal (2011), about a young man with Tourette syndrome, Emmy nomination
- The Stand-In (2011), a personal documentary about elder care and the undocumented with a premiere on PBS.
- Sounding the Alarm: Battling the Autism Epidemic (2014), a documentary about raising a child with autism, presented at the Nantucket Film Festival and the Tribeca Film Festival
- The One That Got Away (2016), a documentary about a promising at-risk youth who went to jail. Preview at the 2015 Montclair Film Festival and premiere at PBS.
- Breslin and Hamill: Deadline Artists (2019), an HBO documentary about two journalists from New York City, Jimmy Breslin and Pete Hamill, 2020 Emmy Award for Outstanding Historical Documentary.
