= Charles Rivkin =

American businessman, diplomat (born 1962)

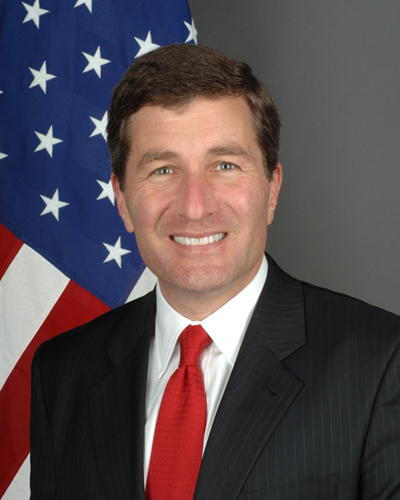
- Official portrait, 2009

Chairman of the Motion Picture Association
- Incumbent
- Assumed office December 6, 2017
- Preceded by: Chris Dodd

Chief Executive Officer of the Motion Picture Association
- Incumbent
- Assumed office September 5, 2017
- Preceded by: Chris Dodd

24th Assistant Secretary of State for Economic and Business Affairs
- In office February 13, 2014 – January 20, 2017
- President: Barack Obama
- Preceded by: Jose W. Fernandez
- Succeeded by: Manisha Singh

United States Ambassador to France
- In office October 2, 2009 – November 20, 2013
- President: Barack Obama
- Preceded by: Craig Roberts Stapleton
- Succeeded by: Jane D. Hartley

2nd United States Ambassador to Monaco
- In office October 2, 2009 – November 20, 2013
- President: Barack Obama
- Preceded by: Craig Roberts Stapleton
- Succeeded by: Jane D. Hartley

Personal details
- Born: Charles Hammerman Rivkin; April 6, 1962 (age 64)
- Party: Democratic
- Spouse: Susan Tolson
- Education: Yale University (BA); Harvard University (MBA)

Charles Hammerman Rivkin (born April 6, 1962) is an American media executive and former United States diplomat who is chairman and chief executive officer (CEO) of the Motion Picture Association (MPA).

Rivkin served as assistant secretary of state for economic and business affairs at the U.S. Department of State from 2014 to 2017. Confirmed by the U.S. Senate on February 12, 2014, Rivkin assumed office the following day, and was sworn in publicly by U.S. secretary of state John Kerry on April 15, 2014. Rivkin's confirmation marked the first time a U.S. ambassador and former CEO ever led the Bureau of Economic and Business Affairs at the U.S. Department of State.

Prior to his appointment, Rivkin served for more than four years as the United States ambassador to France and Monaco where he led America's first and one of its largest diplomatic missions, which has six constituent posts throughout France and represents over 50 U.S. government agencies and sections. In this capacity, Rivkin also served as the U.S. permanent observer to the Council of Europe.

== Early life and education ==
Rivkin is one of four children of Enid Hammerman and William R. Rivkin, who was the United States ambassador to Luxembourg under President John F. Kennedy and United States Ambassador to Senegal and Gambia under President Lyndon B. Johnson. His mother's grandfather founded J K Industries, a large children's clothing manufacturer, greatly expanded by Rivkin's grandfather. In 1967, Rivkin's father died when he was just 5 years old. His widowed mother remarried Chicago obstetrician Dr. John S. Long in 1971. Rivkin is of Russian Jewish descent.

Rivkin spent his junior year of high school with School Year Abroad (SYA) at its SYA France campus located in Rennes, France. Rivkin earned a B.A. from Yale University in 1984. He graduated with distinction in political science and international relations. At Yale, he was a member of two Yale a cappella groups: the underclassmen Spizzwinks and the all-senior Whiffenpoofs. He then earned an M.B.A. from Harvard University in 1988.

== Business career ==
Prior to entering government service, Rivkin worked in the media sector for over 20 years, serving as president and CEO of entertainment companies such as the Jim Henson Company, then-home of the Muppets. He also served as CEO of Wildbrain where he won a BAFTA Award as Executive Producer of the hit TV series Yo Gabba Gabba!. Rivkin helped engineer the sale of The Jim Henson Company to EM.TV in 2000 for nearly $1 billion and was named one of the 100 Most Creative People in Business by Fast Company.

== Political activities ==
Rivkin served as an at-large California delegate for Senator John Kerry at the 2004 Democratic National Convention and for Barack Obama at the 2008 Democratic National Convention. Rivkin was the California finance co-chair for Obama's 2008 presidential campaign and one of his top fund raisers.

== Ambassador to France and Monaco ==
Rivkin assumed the role of Ambassador in August 2009, sworn in by Supreme Court Justice Ruth Bader Ginsburg. Ambassador Rivkin's service in France came at one of the bilateral relationship's strongest moments in recent history. To honor the legacy of Franco-American friendship and to commemorate the 68th anniversary of the Allied invasion of mainland Europe during World War II, Rivkin took part in a mass parachute jump over the coast of Normandy on June 3, 2012. An estimated crowd of 25,000 watched Rivkin land in a field near Sainte-Mère-Église amidst heavy winds, as he became the first US Ambassador to France to jump from a plane in honor of the troops who fought on D-Day. In support of the U.S. Navy, Rivkin became the first US Ambassador to take off and land on a Navy aircraft carrier in an F-18 Super Hornet when he participated in a training exercise with naval aviators on the USS Eisenhower in March 2013.

According to the Department of State Office of Inspector General's report in May 2012, Rivkin placed new emphasis on support for US exports of goods and services into France. The report called Rivkin a "dynamic and visionary noncareer Ambassador", and credited him with expanding the U.S. Embassy's public diplomacy activities, particularly through his use of social media and his appearances on French national television. Rivkin introduced social media to Embassy Paris, establishing its first ever Facebook and Twitter accounts.

As ambassador, Rivkin made youth outreach one of his key priorities and connected the embassy to the next generation of leaders throughout France, including in disadvantaged communities in the banlieues outside larger cities. Rivkin organized a series of seminars for French youth, inviting them to meet with prominent American government officials, actors and musicians. Beginning with actor Samuel L. Jackson's April 2010 visit with students in Bondy, an economically depressed Parisian suburb, Rivkin set up seminars and hosted events with Stephen Colbert, Sylvester Stallone, Woody Allen, Jodie Foster, will.i.am of the Black Eyed Peas, Robert Zemeckis, Allen Stone, Tony Bennett, Herbie Hancock, Maya Angelou, Toni Morrison and many others. "Much of the embassy's outreach is meant to dispel 'mistruths' about the United States," Rivkin said in an interview, adding, "It's easier to hate something you don't understand." In January 2012, Rivkin broadened his outreach efforts by creating the Washburne Award for Innovation in Diversity, recognizing one French and one American company for their best practices in fostering diversity in hiring practices.

On July 16, 2013, French president François Hollande awarded Ambassador Rivkin the rank of Commander in the Légion d'honneur at the Elysée Palace. Rivkin is the first US ambassador in half a century to receive the decoration from a sitting French president. Rivkin's tenure as ambassador to France received highly favorable reviews by both State Department audits and from his embassy's employees. Rivkin left office in November 2013 following his nomination to become an Assistant Secretary of the State Department.

In February 2015, Rivkin received la Grande Médaille de Vermeil de la Ville de Paris, the city of Paris' highest honor, from Paris Mayor Anne Hidalgo. In December 2016, Rivkin received the Navy Distinguished Public Service Award, the U.S. Department of the Navy's highest civilian recognition, from Secretary of the Navy Ray Mabus.

== Assistant Secretary of State for Economic and Business Affairs ==
As assistant secretary of state for economic and business affairs, Rivkin led a bureau at the U.S. State Department that is responsible for managing trade negotiations, investment treaties, economic sanctions, transportation affairs, telecommunications policy, international finance and development related issues, as well as intellectual property right protection. The Bureau is also the Department of State's primary link to the private sector through its Office of Commercial and Business Affairs, which supports U.S. business interests internationally and works to create U.S. jobs by facilitating foreign investment in the United States.

In his first year as assistant secretary, Rivkin led multiple economic policy dialogues on behalf of the State Department, including discussions with Colombia, the United Arab Emirates, and Turkey.

In June 2014, Rivkin co-chaired a meeting of the U.S.–Israel Joint Economic Development Group (JEDG) with the ambassador to Israel, Daniel B. Shapiro, in Tel Aviv; held bilateral meetings with Israeli Government officials in Jerusalem; and bilateral meetings with Palestinian businessmen and officials of the Palestinian National Authority in Ramallah. In May 2016 in Ramallah, Rivkin led the first U.S.-Palestinian Economic Dialogue since 2004 in an effort to support private sector growth in the Palestinian economy.

In October 2015 and December 2016, Rivkin co-chaired the first and second annual U.S.-Qatar Economic and Investment Dialogues.

In March 2016, Rivkin and U.S. Secretary of Transportation Anthony Foxx signed an arrangement with Cuban government officials to reestablish regularly scheduled flights between the United States and Cuba for the first time in more than 50 years.

In addition, Rivkin provided guidance to the Department of State's 1,600 economic officers around the world and to the U.S. Mission to the Organisation for Economic Co-operation and Development.

== Motion Picture Association ==
As announced on April 28, 2017, Rivkin succeeded Chris Dodd as CEO of the Motion Picture Association (then the Motion Picture Association of America), effective September 5, 2017, and as chairman, effective December 6, 2017. Rivkin's priorities include defending intellectual property and bolstering the MPA's content protection efforts, incentivizing the production of new films and television shows to spur job creation and growth, and expanding U.S. studios' access to international markets, particularly China. In January 2019 Rivkin was directly responsible for Netflix joining the MPA, helping to further the growth and evolution of the trade association. He also aims to elevate the MPA's profile through improved branding and social media communications, as well as more high-profile events in Washington, D.C.,. Rivkin views the entertainment industry not just as an economic force but also as a projection of U.S. values and a form of soft power.

In September 2019, Rivkin unified the association's regional sub-brands (MPA Canada, MPA Europe, Middle East, and Africa) under the banner of a more globally aligned MPA to better reflect the international audiences its member studios serve.

In October 2020, Rivkin recruited Apple TV+ to join the Alliance for Creativity and Entertainment (ACE), the global coalition to reduce piracy and protect the legal marketplace for creative content. During Rivkin's tenure, ACE membership has grown to include 35 leading global media and entertainment companies.

In 2024, Rivkin recruited and brought on board Amazon Prime Video & MGM Studios to join the MPA as its seventh member, a notable convergence of tech and entertainment.

Rivkin accepted the Distinguished Cross of the Police Merit with Distinction—the highest honor awarded by the Spanish National Police to a civilian—from Francisco Pardo Piqueras, General Director of the National Police Corps (Spain), in recognition of the work the MPA and the Alliance for Creativity and Entertainment (ACE) have done to fight piracy and protect intellectual property rights.

In 2025, Rivkin received the American Cinematheque Power of Cinema Award for significant contribution to the art of the Moving Picture.

== Personal life ==
In 1990, Rivkin married Susan Tolson. They live in Washington, D.C., and have two children, Elias and Lily.

His brother Robert S. Rivkin served as deputy mayor of the City of Chicago between July 20, 2017, and March 1, 2019, and also served as the 21st general counsel of the United States Department of Transportation (DOT) under President Barack Obama; his brother's wife, Cindy S. Moelis, was appointed director of the Presidential Commission on White House Fellows. His aunt, Joanne H. Alter, was the first woman to be elected to a countywide office in the metropolitan Chicago area. His cousin, Jonathan Alter, is an author and NBC correspondent; and his cousin Jamie Alter Lynton, the wife of former Sony executive Michael Lynton, is one of California's biggest political fundraisers.

His family has presented the "Rivkin Award" at the United States Department of State since 1968 as a way to honor intellectual courage and constructive dissent in the American Foreign Service. The award was created in part with the help of Charles Rivkin's godfather, Hubert H. Humphrey, after the elder Rivkin's death at 47, in 1967.

Diplomatic posts
Preceded by Craig Roberts Stapleton	United States Ambassador to France; 2009–2013	Succeeded by Jane D. Hartley
Preceded by Craig Roberts Stapleton	United States Ambassador to Monaco; 2009–2013	Succeeded by Jane D. Hartley
Preceded by Jose W. Fernandez	Assistant Secretary of State for Economic and Business Affairs; 2014–2017	Succeeded by Patricia M. Haslach; Acting
Non-profit organization positions
Preceded by Chris Dodd	Chief Executive Officer of the Motion Picture Association of America; 2017–present	Incumbent
