= Mercer Cook =

American diplomat (1903–1987)

Will Mercer Cook
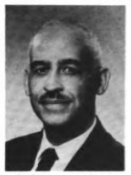

3rd United States Ambassador to Senegal
- In office July 9, 1964 – July 1, 1966
- President: Lyndon B. Johnson
- Preceded by: Philip Mayer Kaiser
- Succeeded by: William R. Rivkin

1st United States Ambassador to The Gambia
- In office May 18, 1965 – July 1, 1966
- President: Lyndon B. Johnson
- Preceded by: office established
- Succeeded by: William R. Rivkin

2nd United States Ambassador to Niger
- In office June 22, 1961 – May 30, 1964
- President: John F. Kennedy; Lyndon B. Johnson
- Preceded by: R. Borden Reams
- Succeeded by: Robert J. Ryan

Personal details
- Born: March 30, 1903 Washington, D.C.
- Died: October 4, 1987 (aged 84) Washington, D.C.
- Spouse: Vashti Smith (August 31, 1929 - 1969, her death)
- Children: Mercer; Jacques
- Education: Amherst College, BA, 1925; University of Paris, teacher's diploma, 1926; Brown University, MA, 1931, PhD, 1936
- Profession: Diplomat

Will Mercer Cook (March 30, 1903 – October 4, 1987), popularly known as Mercer Cook, was an American diplomat and professor. He was the first United States ambassador to the Gambia after it became independent, appointed in 1965 while also still serving as ambassador to Senegal. He was also the second American ambassador to Niger.

== Biography ==
Will Mercer Cook was born on March 30, 1903, in Washington D.C., to Will Marion Cook, a famous composer of musical theatre, and Abbie Mitchell Cook, a soprano singer. She became best known for playing the role of "Clara" in the premier production of George Gershwin's Porgy and Bess (1935). Cook's sister, and only sibling, was born Marion Abigail Cook in 1900. As a child, Cook traveled extensively in the United States and Europe with his parents as they pursued their respective careers in the entertainment industry. They placed their daughter to be raised by family because of their performance schedules. In Washington, DC, the Cook family lived across the street from the legendary jazz musician Duke Ellington.

Cook attended Dunbar High School in Washington D.C., a predominantly black academic school. He graduated from Amherst College with a bachelor's degree in 1925 and went to Paris for further study. He received his teacher's diploma from the University of Paris in 1926.

After his return, in 1929, Cook married Vashti Smith, a social worker. The couple had two sons, named Mercer, Jr. and Jacques. Smith also influenced Cook to convert to Catholicism.

Cook earned a master's degree in French from Brown University in 1931 and a doctorate in 1936. He returned to Paris in 1934, on a fellowship from the General Education Board.

While completing his graduate education, Cook worked as an assistant professor of romance languages at Howard University from 1927 until 1936. Upon completing his doctorate, Cook became a professor of French at Atlanta University, serving from 1936 until 1943. During that time, he received a Rosenwald Fellowship to study in Paris and the French West Indies. In 1942, he received another General Education Board Fellowship to the University of Havana. From 1943 to 1945, Cook worked as a professor of English at the University of Haiti. During this time, he wrote the Handbook for Haitian Teachers of English. He also wrote the literary criticism titled Five French Negro Authors and edited an anthology of Haitian readings.

After two years in Haiti, Cook returned to Washington, D.C., to work as a professor of romance languages at Howard University, where he stayed until 1960. During this time, Cook continued to write about Haiti, and he also translated works of African and West Indian writers from French to English. Most notably, in 1959, Cook translated the works of Leopold Senghor, who was a former president of Senegal and an established French author.

== Ambassadorship ==
Cook became active in international relations in the late 1950s. From 1958 to 1960, he served as a foreign representative for the American Society of African Culture. The following year, he worked as the director of the African program for the Congress of Cultural Freedom.

In 1961, President John F. Kennedy appointed Cook as the U.S. ambassador to Niger. Niger was a French colony that had achieved independence in 1960. Cook's duties as ambassador included overseeing U.S. economic aid programs in the country, administering the Peace Corps, and supervising U.S. information and cultural activities in the country. His wife was also involved in many social programs, including a project to distribute medical supplies across the country and participation in women's groups.

In 1963, Cook was also designated as an alternate delegate to the General Assembly of the United Nations. He served as the United States Ambassador to Niger until 1964 when he was selected to be the US Ambassador to the Republic of Senegal.

In 1966, Cook returned to Howard University to become head of the department of romance languages. He worked as a visiting professor at Harvard University in 1969.

In 1969, Cook published The Militant Black Writer in Africa and the United States, co-authored with Stephen Henderson of Morehouse College. The book consisted of expanded versions of speeches delivered by the two men at a 1968 conference in Madison, Wisconsin, called "Anger and Beyond:" The Black Writer and a World in Revolution. In his essay, Cook described a half-century tradition of protest among African poets and novelists. Cook concluded his essay by stating: "In the main, statements by the Africans seem to me less extreme and violent than many by West Indian and North American blacks."

Cook retired from academia in 1970. He continued to write and publish professionally in the 1970s. Cook died of pneumonia in Washington, D.C., on October 4, 1987.

== Awards ==
- John W. Simpson Fellowship, 1925–26
- General Education Board Fellowship, 1934, 1942
- Rosenwald Fellowship, 1938
- Received decorations from the Government of Haiti, 1945, the Republic of Niger, 1964, and Senegal, 1966
- Palmes Academiques, France; LL.D., Amherst College, 1965; LL.D., Brown University, 1970.

== Memberships ==
- Association for the Study of Negro Life and History
- American Society of Composers, Authors, and Publishers
- American Association of Teachers of French
- Académie des Sciences Morales et Politiques
- National Association for the Advancement of Colored People
- Phi Beta Kappa
- Omega Psi Phi

Diplomatic posts
Preceded by Philip Mayer Kaiser	United States Ambassador to Senegal; 1964–1966	Succeeded by William Robert Rivkin
Preceded by R. Borden Reams	United States Ambassador to Niger; 1961–1964	Succeeded by Robert J. Ryan
Preceded by post created	United States Ambassador to the Gambia; 1965–1966	Succeeded by William R. Rivkin
