= Ken Moelis =

American investment banker

- Born: Kenneth D. Moelis; 1958 (age 67–68)
- Education: Wharton School of the University of Pennsylvania (BS, MBA)
- Occupation: Investment banker
- Employer: Moelis & Company
- Known for: Founder, Moelis & Company
- Title: Executive Chairman
- Spouse: Julie Lynn Taffet
- Family: Cindy S. Moelis (sister); Robert S. Rivkin (brother-in-law)

Kenneth D. Moelis (born 1958) is an American billionaire investment banker. He is the founder and executive chairman of Moelis & Company, a global independent investment banking firm where he previously served as its CEO.

== Early life and education ==
Moelis was born in 1958, the son of Gaye (née Gross) and Herbert I. Moelis, president of Equity Leasing Corporation, an office equipment company in New York, of which his grandfather, Paul I. Gross was its retired president. His father is also a breeder of thoroughbred race horses at his CandyLand Stables in Middletown, Delaware. Moelis holds a Bachelor of Science in Economics and a Masters of Business Administration from the Wharton School of the University of Pennsylvania.

== Career ==
Moelis began his career at Drexel Burnham Lambert in 1981 where he would ultimately serve as a managing director working for Michael Milken in the firm's Los Angeles office. Following the collapse of Drexel, Moelis left with a portion of his team to join Donaldson Lufkin & Jenrette where he served as head of its corporate finance investment banking division. Under Moelis, DLJ emerged as a prominent investment banking firm in Los Angeles in the 1990s.

Following the acquisition of DLJ by Credit Suisse First Boston in 2000, Moelis was named head of US investment banking of the combined firm in September 2000. However, his tenure at CSFB would be short, announcing his departure for UBS (then known as UBS Warburg) just months later taking the core of his team with him, including a number that would later join Moelis & Company. Moelis recruited more than 70 senior investment bankers to UBS within three months of his arrival.

In his six years at UBS, Moelis ultimately assumed the role of president of UBS Investment Bank and was credited with the build-out of UBS's investment banking operation in the United States. By the end of 2006, UBS was ranked Top 4 in the global fee pool for the first time.

Moelis founded Moelis & Company along with several fellow senior UBS investment bankers that included Navid Mahmoodzadegan, Jeff Raich, John Momtazee, Elizabeth Crain and Warren Woo. Moelis stepped down as CEO of the firm in October 2025, staying on as its executive chairman.

== Other affiliations ==
Moelis received both his undergraduate degree and MBA from The Wharton School at the University of Pennsylvania in 1981. Today he is a member of the Wharton board of overseers. Moelis is chairman of the Tourette Association of America and is on the board of governors of Cedars Sinai Hospital. Moelis is a member of the Hillcrest Country Club. In 2011, 2014, and 2016, he was included in the 50 Most Influential ranking of Bloomberg Markets magazine.

== Personal life ==
In 1983, Moelis married Julie Lynn Taffet in a Jewish ceremony at the Sephardic Temple in Cedarhurst, New York. His sister, Cindy S. Moelis, was appointed director of the Presidential Commission on White House Fellows and is married to Robert S. Rivkin who was appointed by President Barack Obama as the 21st General Counsel of the United States Department of Transportation (DOT) Moelis was an investor in Yotta Savings, a prize-linked savings account fintech company that was cofounded by his son, Adam.
