= Jose W. Fernandez =

Cuban-American attorney (born 1955)

Jose Fernandez
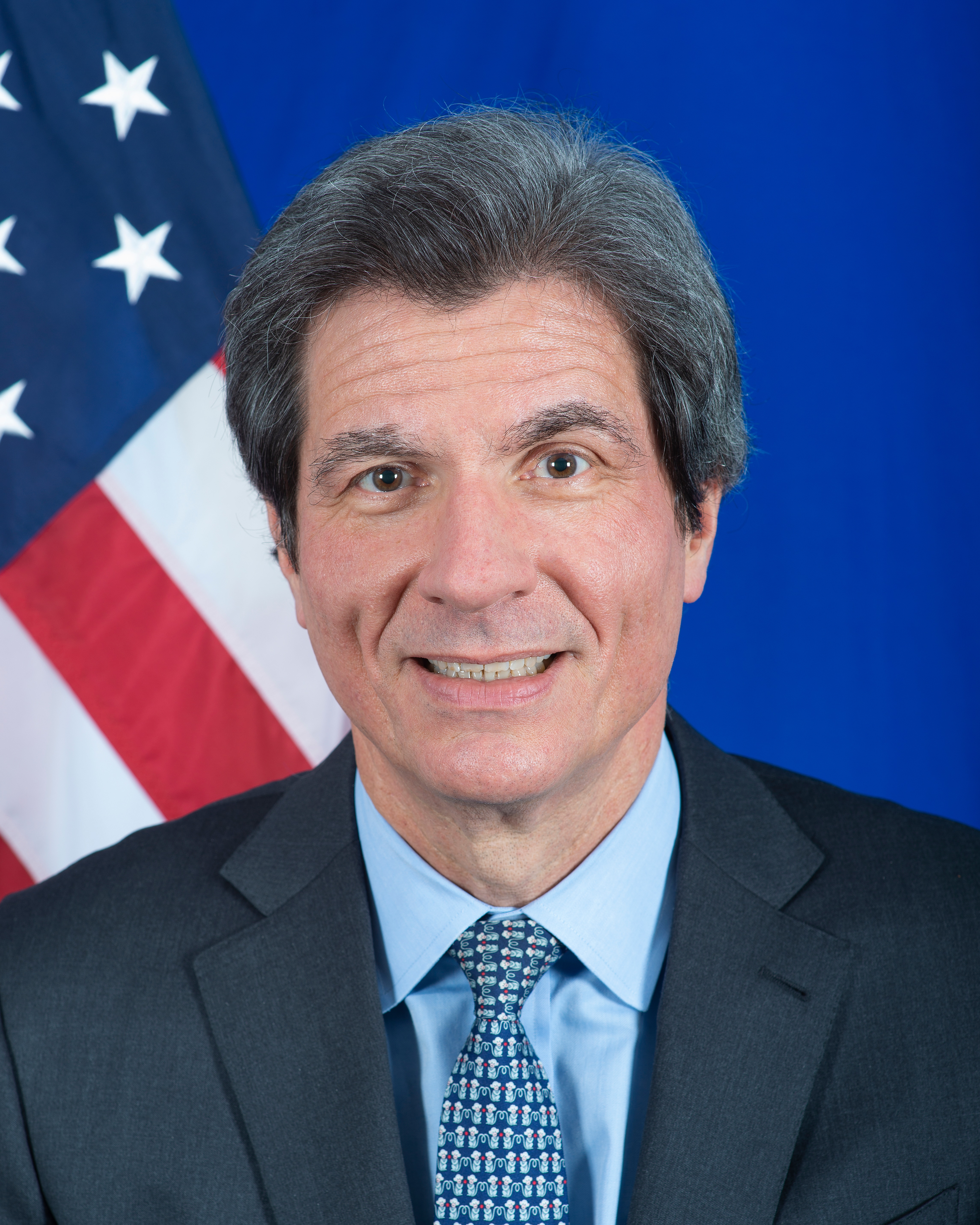
- Official portrait, 2021

21st Under Secretary of State for Economic Growth, Energy, and the Environment
- In office August 6, 2021 – January 20, 2025
- President: Joe Biden
- Preceded by: Keith J. Krach
- Succeeded by: Jacob Helberg

23rd Assistant Secretary of State for Economic and Business Affairs
- In office December 2, 2009 – October 2, 2013
- President: Barack Obama
- Preceded by: Dan Sullivan
- Succeeded by: Charles Rivkin

Personal details
- Born: 1955 (age 70–71) Cuba
- Children: 2
- Education: Dartmouth College (BA); Columbia University (JD)

Jose Walfredo Fernandez (born 1955) is a Cuban-American attorney and diplomat who had served as the Under Secretary of State for Economic Growth, Energy, and the Environment. Fernandez previously served as the Assistant Secretary of State for Economic, Energy, and Business Affairs from 2009 to 2013.

== Early life and education ==
Fernandez was born in Cuba in 1955. His father worked as a lawyer and his mother was a seamstress. The family moved to the United States in 1967, settling in Hudson County, New Jersey.

Fernandez graduated magna cum laude with high honors from Dartmouth College, earning a Bachelor of Arts degree in history. He earned a Juris Doctor from the Columbia Law School, where he received the Charles Evans Hughes Prize and a Parker School Certificate of International Law with Honors. He served on the Board of Trustees of Dartmouth College from 2003 to 2009.

== Career ==
Fernandez was named one of the "World's Leading Lawyers" by Chambers Global for his M&A and corporate expertise, an "Expert" in International Financial Law Review's "Guide to the World's Leading Project Finance Lawyers", and one of the "World's Leading Privatization Lawyers" by Euromoney Publications. He is recognized as a leading Corporate Finance attorney in the Latin American market in the Chambers Global 2008 legal guide and a leading Latin America attorney in the Chambers U.S. 2008 legal guide. He was featured by Hispanic Business Magazine in its "100 Influentials List" for 2006 and 2007.

Fernandez began his career at the United States Department of State after working as a partner in the New York City office of Latham & Watkins and global chair of the firm's Latin America practice.

Fernandez served as the Assistant Secretary of State for Economic, Energy and Business Affairs from December 2009 to October 2013. He led the Bureau that is responsible for overseeing work on international trade and investment policy; international finance, development, and debt policy; economic sanctions and combating terrorist financing; international energy security policy; international telecommunications and transportation policies; and support for U.S. businesses and the private sector overseas.

Fernandez served on the Board of Trustees of Dartmouth College and on the Board of Directors of Accion International and the Council of the Americas. He has been chair both of the American Bar Association's Inter-American Law Committee and the Committee on Inter-American Affairs of the Association of the Bar of the City of New York, and co-chair of the Cross Border M&A and Joint Ventures Committee of the New York State Bar Association. He recently headed the Latin American and Caribbean division of the ABA Rule of Law Initiative. He has also served on the boards of NPR-station WBGO-FM, Ballet Hispanico of New York and the Middle East Institute. He was a co-founder of TeatroStageFest, a two-week Latino theater festival in New York City, and was appointed a Commissioner of New York's Latin Media and Entertainment Commission. Fernandez is a member of the Council of Foreign Relations.

He became a member of the board of directors of Iberdrola in 2015. to 2021, when he resigned Following his departure from the Department of State in October 2013, Fernandez returned to the practice of law as a partner in the New York City office of Gibson, Dunn & Crutcher.

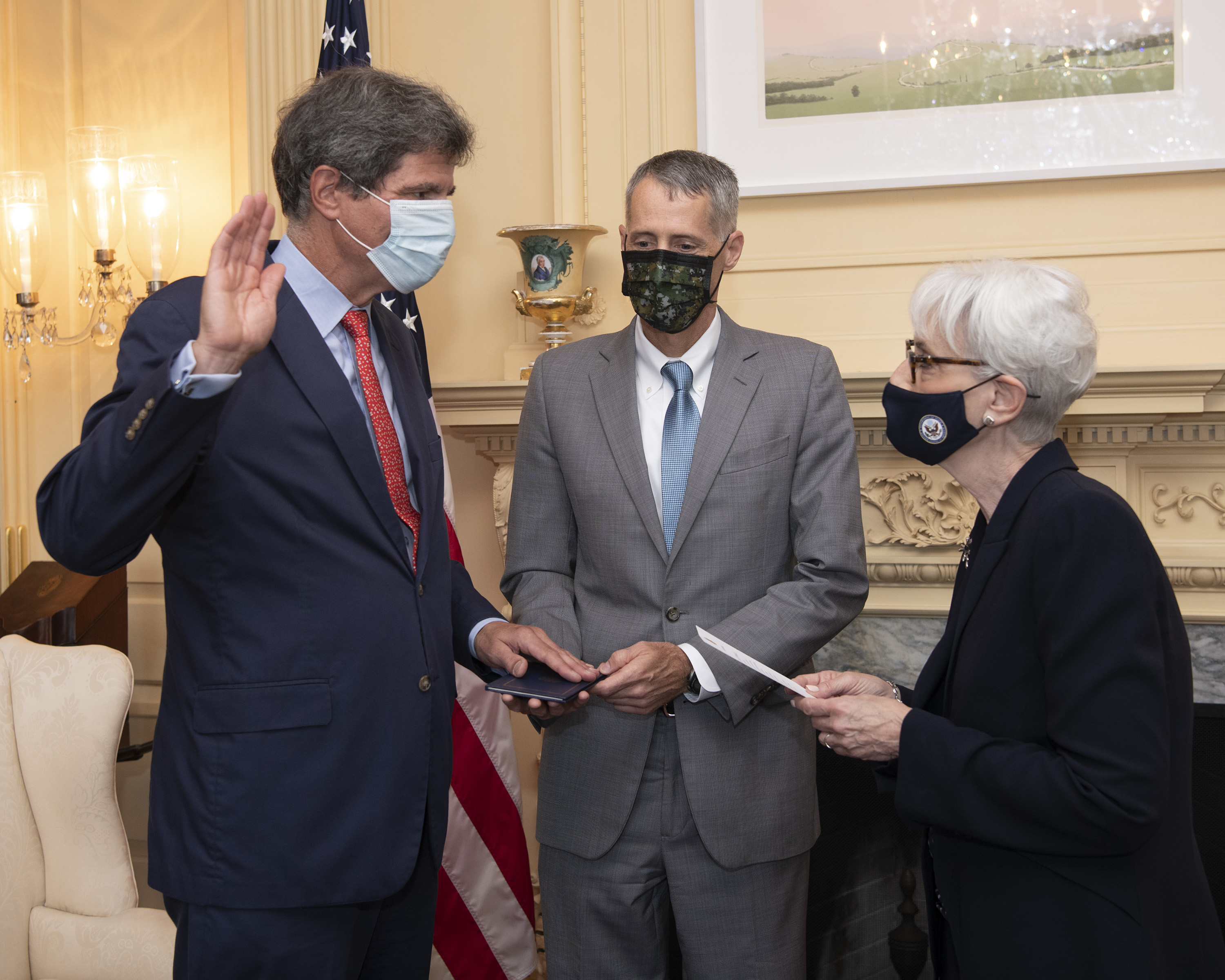
Fernandez sworn in as Under Secretary of State for Economic Growth, Energy and the Environment by Deputy Secretary of State Wendy R. Sherman in August 2021.

=== Biden administration ===
On March 17, 2021, President Joe Biden nominated Fernandez for the following positions: Under Secretary of State for Economic Growth, Energy, and the Environment, United States Alternate Governor to the European Bank for Reconstruction and Development, United States Alternate Governor to the International Bank for Reconstruction and Development, and United States Alternate Governor to the Inter-American Development Bank. The Senate Foreign Relations Committee examined all these nominations on April 28, 2021. Fernandez's nominations were favorably reported to the Senate floor on May 25, 2021. On August 6, 2021, the U.S. Senate confirmed Fernandez to all those positions.
