= William R. Rivkin =

American diplomat

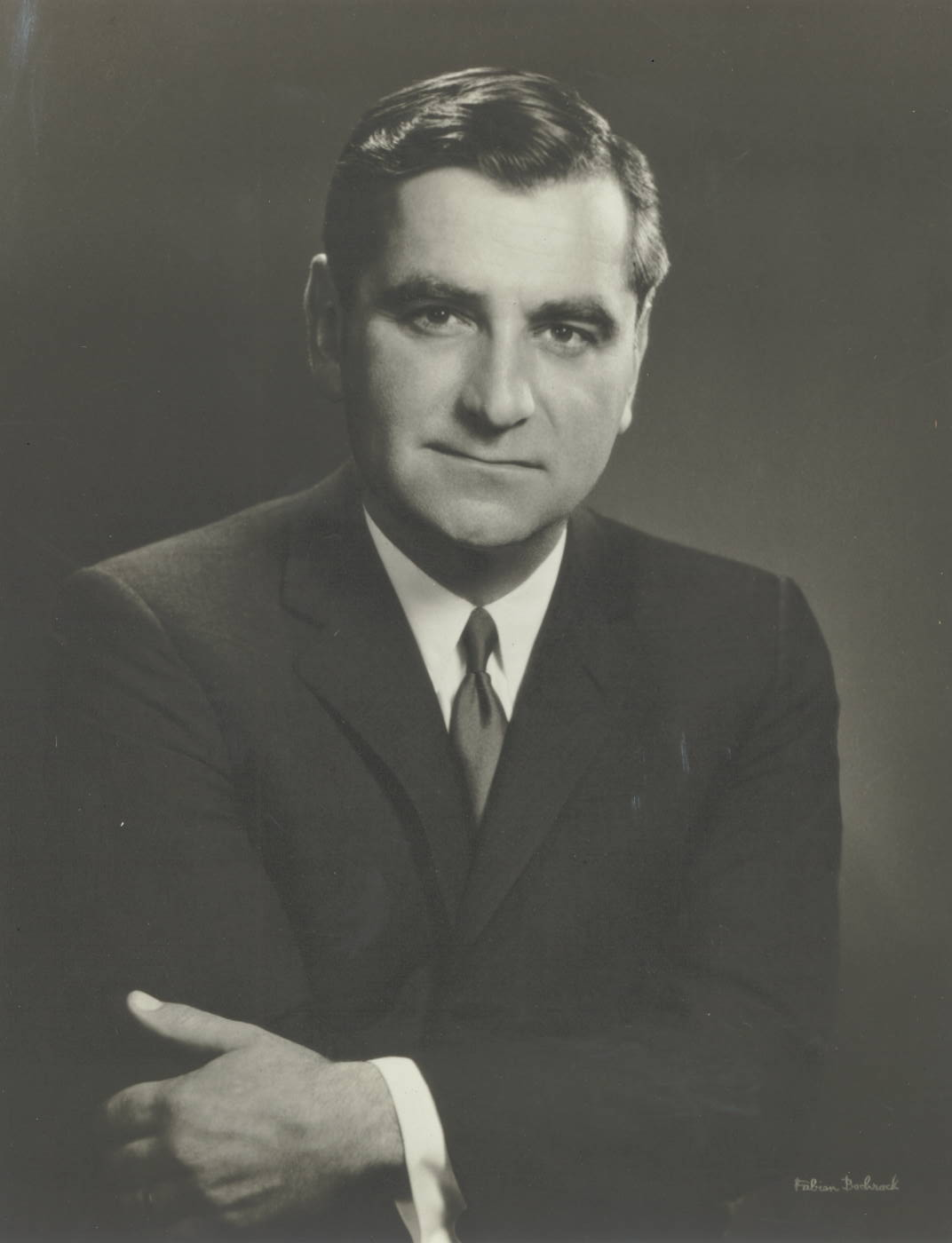

United States Ambassador to Luxembourg
- In office 1962–1965
- President: John F. Kennedy

United States Ambassador to Senegal
- In office 1966–1967
- President: Lyndon B. Johnson

United States Ambassador to the Gambia
- In office 1966–1967
- President: Lyndon B. Johnson

Personal details
- Born: William Robert Rivkin; April 16, 1919 Muscatine, Iowa, US
- Died: March 19, 1967 (aged 47)
- Spouse: Helen Enid Hammerman
- Relations: Cindy S. Moelis (daughter-in-law); Joanne H. Alter (sister-in-law)
- Children: Laura Rivkin Ledford; Julie Rivkin Wheeler; Robert S. Rivkin; Charles Rivkin
- Education: University of Iowa (B.A.); Northwestern University (J.D.)
- Occupation: Diplomat

William Robert Rivkin (April 16, 1919 – March 19, 1967) was a United States diplomat who served as ambassador to Luxembourg, Senegal, and Gambia in the 1960s.

== Early life and education ==
Rivkin was born in 1919, the first child of Samuel Wolf Rivkin, an immigrant from the Russian Empire who worked as a local tailor, and Florence Fryer, a British immigrant who had met Samuel in Muscatine, Iowa. He grew up in Davenport, Iowa and graduated from Davenport High School, now Davenport Central High School. He received a bachelor of arts degree from the University of Iowa in 1941 and a J.D. degree from Northwestern University in 1948. While at Iowa, he was the national intercollegiate oratorical champion. At Northwestern, he edited the Northwestern Law Review and finished first in his law class.

After graduation from Iowa, Rivkin joined the United States Army, where he rose to the rank of lieutenant colonel during World War II. He was awarded the Bronze Star and received the French l'ordre de la santé publique, rank of chevalier.

== Government service ==
In 1956, Rivkin served as deputy director of Adlai E. Stevenson II's second Presidential campaign, and in 1960 was the Midwest coordinator of the Presidential Campaign of then-Senator John F. Kennedy.

He was a U.S. diplomat, serving as Ambassador to Luxembourg (1962-1965) under President John F. Kennedy, and to Senegal (1966-1967) and the Gambia (1966-1967) under President Lyndon B. Johnson. He was a member of the Council on Foreign Relations and Phi Beta Kappa.

== Personal life and death ==
In 1959, Rivkin married Helen Enid Hammerman. Helen's grandfather founded J.K. Industries in Chicago and her father, Sol Hammerman, and her Uncle Meyer Hammerman, grew it into one of the nation's largest children's clothing manufacturers at the time. They remained married until his death in 1967. They had four children:

- Laura Ledford;
- Julie Wheeler;
- Robert S. Rivkin, a current senior vice president of Delta Air Lines, and the former General Counsel of the United States Department of Transportation (since April 2009). He is married to Cindy S. Moelis who was appointed by President Obama to serve as the Director of the President's Commission on White House Fellowships in April 2009.
- Charles Rivkin, is the chairman and chief executive officer (CEO) of the Motion Picture Association (MPA) and the former U.S. Assistant Secretary of State for Economic and Business Affairs, as well as the former United States Ambassador to France (2009-2013).

In 1971, Enid remarried to Dr. John Sterry Long and dedicated the rest of her life to humanitarian causes particularly focusing on the delivery of medical and food aid to distressed populations in remote regions of the world.

Rivkin died in 1967. He is interred at Arlington National Cemetery in Arlington, Virginia. The annual Rivkin award of the United States Foreign Service is presented in his honour.

Diplomatic posts
Preceded by Mercer Cook	United States Ambassador to the Gambia; 1966-1967	Succeeded by L. Dean Brown
Preceded by Mercer Cook	United States Ambassador to Senegal; 1966-1967	Succeeded by L. Dean Brown
Preceded by James Wine	United States Ambassador to Luxembourg; 1962–1965	Succeeded by Patricia Roberts Harris
