= Breslin and Hamill: Deadline Artists =

2018 film

- Directed by: John Block; Jonathan Alter; Steve McCarthy
- Based on: Interviews of Jimmy Breslin, Pete Hamill, and contemporaries Archival material
- Produced by: Jonathan Alter; John Block; Steve McCarthy; Nancy Abraham (E.P., HBO)
- Starring: Jimmy Breslin, Pete Hamill, Michael Rispoli (voice for Jimmy Breslin)
- Cinematography: Steve McCarthy
- Edited by: Geof Bartz, Angela Gandini
- Music by: Wendy Blackstone
- Release dates: November 15, 2018 (DOC NYC Festival); January 28, 2019
- Running time: 106 minutes
- Country: United States of America
- Language: English

Breslin and Hamill: Deadline Artists is a 2018 HBO documentary about Jimmy Breslin and Pete Hamill, "two of the most celebrated newspapermen of the 20th century" who worked in New York City covering events of the late 20th century. The film was directed by John Block, Jonathan Alter, and Steve McCarthy.

== Summary ==
The documentary traces the careers of Breslin and Hamill as reporters and columnists in New York City from the Kennedy assassinations to the 9/11 attacks. Breslin and Hamill worked for the New York Daily News and the New York Post, respectively, as well as for other newspapers among them as the Village Voice. Both came from an Irish Catholic working-class background, neither of them finished college. They worked as "shoe-leather" reporters chasing stories. The documentary examines their way of reporting, their writing styles, their advocacy for the poor, the underdog, and the "working man", the impact of their columns, but also faults, an example being Breslin's put-down of a female Asian-born journalist. Both became celebrities in their days; Breslin ran for City Council President and starred in beer commercials while Hamill dated Jackie Onassis and Shirley MacLaine.

== Production ==
The film was started in 2015 after Alter and McCarthy invited filmmaker Block to join in the project. HBO underwrote the film with Nancy Abraham as the Executive Producer. Breslin and Hamill were interviewed several times for the movie by the producers starting in 2015. Aside from their interviews, over 40 people who knew them were interviewed, among them Tom Brokaw, Gail Collins, Robert De Niro, Spike Lee, Les Payne, Nick Pileggi, Earl Caldwell, Colin Quinn, Gloria Steinem, Gay Talese, Garry Trudeau, Tom Wolfe, and Ronnie Eldridge (Breslin's second wife). Like Breslin, Tom Wolfe and Les Payne died before the film was completed.

Archived material was used for local events and subjects like Bernhard Goetz, Son of Sam, Central Park Five, and the Crown Heights riot and national events including the Kennedy assassinations, the civil rights movement, the Vietnam war, and the 9/11 attacks. Michael Rispoli gave his voice to columns written by Breslin while Hamill read his own writing.

The world premiere took place in Manhattan on November 15, 2018; it was the closing night film at the Doc NYC Film Festival. An HBO premiere occurred on January 22, 2019, with a second showing in Washington, D.C. three days later. The documentary was first aired on HBO on January 28, 2019.

== Reception ==
By early February, the film had generated a Rotten Tomatoes score of 100%.

Stephanie Zacharek from Time magazine describes the film to be "a lively and sly documentary" and was fond of the interviews with Breslin and Hamill. Rick Kogan describes the film as "a feast of interviews, vintage footage, stories you'll remember and people you won't soon forget ... not a lament but a celebration of the way things used to be." He finds the film to be "bracingly romantic without being sickly nostalgic."

Meredith Blake indicates that the film "harks back to a more raucous period in journalism, when newsrooms were loud and so were the men — it was mostly men — who led them ...(b)efore the news business was the elite, white-collar bastion it has, by some accounts, become." Sophie Gilbert finds that the directors are "convincing in their argument that Breslin and Hamill shaped the way news stories are told, inspiring a generation to try to emulate their melding of dogged reporting and writerly craft" but describes it also as a "swooningly nostalgic portrait" of a time that in its masculinity may have kept "a generation of talented reporters on the margins".

== Awards ==
The film received the 2020 News & Documentary Emmy Award for Outstanding Historical Documentary.
