= Cindy S. Moelis =

American public servant

- Born: 1961 (age 64–65)
- Education: BA, Wharton School of the University of Pennsylvania; JD, Stanford University Law School
- Occupations: Public servant, attorney
- Spouse: Robert S. Rivkin
- Children: 3
- Parent(s): Gaye Gross Moelis; Herbert I. Moelis
- Family: Kenneth D. Moelis (brother); Ron Moelis (brother); Charles Rivkin (brother-in-law); William R. Rivkin (father-in-law)

Cindy S. Moelis (born 1961) currently serves as the president of the Pritzker Traubert Foundation and is the former director of the President’s Commission on White House Fellowships.

== Biography ==
Moelis was born to a Jewish family, the daughter of Gaye (née Gross) and Herbert I. Moelis, president of Equity Leasing Corporation, an office equipment company in New York, of which her grandfather, Paul I. Gross was its retired president. She has two brothers: Ronald and Kenneth. Her father is also a breeder of thoroughbred race horses at his CandyLand Stables in Middletown, Delaware.

Moelis graduated magna cum laude from the Wharton School of the University of Pennsylvania and earned a J.D. from Stanford University Law School in 1987. After school, she worked as an assistant to Chicago Mayor Richard M. Daley for social policy where she worked with Michelle Obama, as a program officer at the Steans Family Foundation, as an Executive Director of a citywide youth development project for the president of the MacArthur Foundation, as a legislative advocate and researcher for the National Committee for Prevention of Child Abuse in Chicago, and as the executive director of the Pritzker Traubert Family Foundation where she supported efforts to improve Chicago’s public education system. Moelis is close friends with Michelle Obama, having worked with her as an attorney in Chicago and served on the inaugural board of directors of Public Allies Chicago which was founded by Obama. On April 9, 2009, she was appointed director of the Presidential Commission on White House Fellows by President Barack Obama succeeding Janet Eissenstat.

== Personal life ==
In 1988, she married Robert S. Rivkin in a Jewish ceremony at the East River Yacht Club in Long Island City, Queens. In 2009, her husband was appointed by President Barack Obama as the 21st general counsel of the United States Department of Transportation (DOT). They have three children: Stephanie, Claire, and Alexander. Her brother-in-law is Charles Rivkin, former ambassador to France and current president of the Motion Picture Association of America. Her elder brothers are both successful businessmen, Kenneth D. Moelis being a prominent investment banker and founder of Moelis & Company, and Ronald Moelis being the CEO and founding partner of L+M Development Partners.
