= Robert S. Rivkin =

American lawyer (born 1960)

Bob Rivkin
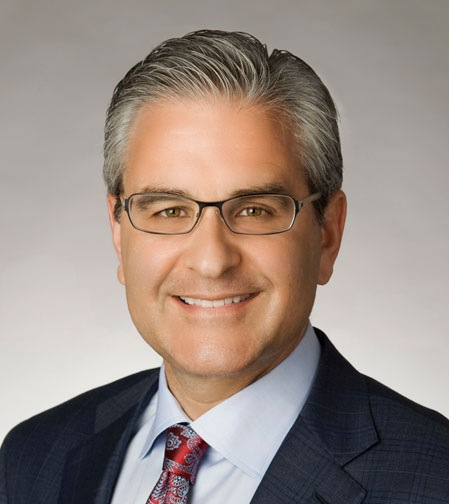

Personal details
- Born: December 6, 1960 (age 65) Chicago, Illinois, U.S.
- Party: Democratic
- Spouse: Cindy S. Moelis
- Children: 3
- Relatives: Enid Hammerman (mother); William R. Rivkin (father); Charles Rivkin (brother); Joanne H. Alter (aunt); Jonathan Alter (cousin); Ken Moelis (brother-in-law)
- Education: Harvard University (BA); Stanford University (JD)

Robert S. Rivkin (born December 6, 1960) is the chief legal officer of United Airlines. Until February 2019, he was Deputy Mayor of the City of Chicago, focusing his efforts on economic development, job creation and retention, and infrastructure. For a year prior to his appointment, he practiced law at Riley Safer Holmes & Cancila LLP, advising clients on aviation, rail, road and other transportation issues, internal investigations, white collar criminal defense, domestic and international business regulation, and commercial litigation. Prior to that, he served as the senior vice president for regulatory and international affairs and deputy general counsel of Delta Air Lines. Prior to joining Delta in April 2013, he was the 21st General Counsel of the United States Department of Transportation (DOT). Appointed by President Barack Obama, Rivkin was sworn in on May 18, 2009, following unanimous confirmation by the United States Senate. While serving as DOT's chief legal officer, Rivkin played a key role in a number of programs and initiatives including the Cash for Clunkers program and the Toyota vehicle recalls.

== Career ==
=== Early work ===
Rivkin, a lawyer, has worked in private practice and public service. He has served as a director of the Chicago-based Metropolitan Planning Council and of the Illinois Chamber of Commerce. He was also an Assistant United States Attorney for the Northern District of Illinois, Director of Programs and Policies for the City of Chicago Law Department, and a partner at a Chicago-based law firm.

In 2001, Rivkin joined the Chicago Transit Authority (CTA) as General Counsel, overseeing the legal operations of the second largest mass transit system in the country. Rivkin was "instrumental" in acquiring $530 million to expand the CTA Brown Line, which was facing a 10% increase in ridership. The project was the costliest CTA expansion ever at the time.

In 2004, Rivkin left the CTA to join then-Chicago-based Aon Corporation as Vice President and Deputy General Counsel. He stayed in that position until 2009.

=== Department of Transportation ===
Appointed by President Barack Obama, Rivkin was sworn in as the 21st General Counsel of the United States Department of Transportation (DOT) on May 18, 2009, following unanimous confirmation by the United States Senate. A longtime Obama supporter and contributor, Rivkin first met Obama in 1991. While with DOT, Rivkin was counsel to Secretary Ray LaHood and served as DOT's Chief Legal Officer, with authority to resolve all legal questions concerning the Department's policies and programs and its over 55,000 employees and $78 billion budget.

In 2009, Rivkin was put in charge of the "Cash for Clunkers" automotive rebate program, a $3 billion U.S. federal scrappage program intended to provide economic incentives to U.S. residents to purchase a new, more fuel-efficient vehicle when trading in a less fuel-efficient vehicle. The program was promoted as providing economic stimulus by boosting car sales, while putting safer, cleaner, and more fuel-efficient vehicles on the road. The department was given an unusually short period of time to plan and develop the program.

Under Rivkin's leadership, DOT issued new traveler protection rules requiring airlines to let customers off planes stuck on the tarmac for three hours. Critics of the rule have argued that it has resulted in "more delays and more flight cancellations".

The rules also increased compensation for involuntarily delayed (or "bumped") passengers, required airlines to advertise their full fares, including any mandatory taxes, fees, or airline charges, and expanded the new tarmac regulations to cover international flights. Rivkin noted that "[hidden fees] serve only to confuse or deceive consumers regarding the true full price of the ticket and to make price comparisons difficult." Spirit Airlines, Allegiant Air, and Southwest Airlines filed a lawsuit against the rule in November 2011, arguing that it violated their First Amendment right to freedom of speech and that the overtaxing of the airline industry is to blame for rising airline costs. Rivkin responded that "deceptive presentations that highlight a low 'base fare' (such as the $9 fares advertised by Spirit that include neither government taxes nor Spirit's own non-optional fees) mislead and confuse consumers, Spirit would be free to add the statement 'fares include $XX.XX in taxes and government fees' in all its fare advertising, provided it did so in a nondeceptive manner." The District of Columbia Court of Appeals rejected Spirit's challenge.

Rivkin also led the department's legal team negotiating a record fine for the violations that led to Toyota's recall of approximately 9 million vehicles because of unintended acceleration.

Rivkin received the Secretary's Gold Medal Award for Outstanding Achievement in both 2010 and 2011.

=== Delta Air Lines ===
On April 9, 2013, it was announced that Rivkin would leave the Department of Transportation to become the senior vice president for regulatory and international affairs and deputy general counsel for Delta Air Lines, where he was responsible for addressing governmental regulation and oversight in the U.S. and abroad, as well as litigation, antitrust, employment and real estate legal issues. He also worked with Delta colleagues and industry associations to advocate Delta's interests across a range of domestic and international areas including bilateral aviation agreements, energy, emissions, competition and consumer rights.

=== City of Chicago ===
After returning to Chicago, from 2017 to 2019 Rivkin served as the Deputy Mayor under Rahm Emanuel.He oversaw the implementation of key priorities across city departments and agencies, focusing his efforts on economic development, job creation and infrastructure. Rivkin served as the Mayor's chief liaison with business, civic and cultural organizations, and his surrogate at local, national and international events.

=== United Airlines ===
In 2019, at the end of Emanuel's second term as mayor, Rivkin joined United Airlines as general counsel, later becoming chief legal officer. He leads United's Legal Department, including the corporate, securities, finance, commercial, litigation, government contracts, intellectual property, antitrust, privacy/cybersecurity, environmental and international groups. He is also responsible for security, facilitation, compliance, ethics and investigations. The United Airlines Legal Department was recognized as Corporate Counsel's Best Legal Department for 2023 at the American Lawyer Industry Awards. In 2025, Bob was named a "Legend in Law" at the Burton Awards ceremony at the Library of Congress, and was listed in Chambers and Partners Spotlight on General Counsel as one of the world's leading in-house lawyers.

=== Corporate Boards ===
From 2022 to 2024, Rivkin was a member of the board of directors and its audit committee of SkyHarbour Group (NYSE: SKYH), an aviation infrastructure company that builds, leases and manages private hangar campuses for business aircraft. He currently serves as a member of the board of directors and chair of the audit committee of Amrize, Ltd. (NYSE: AMRZ), a $12 billion revenue building materials (cement, concrete, aggregate) and building envelope (Elevate, Duro-Last, Malarkey) business with over 1,000 sites in North America.

== Early life, education, and personal life ==
Robert Samuel Rivkin was born on December 6, 1960, to parents Enid Hammerman and William R. Rivkin, the 3rd of 4 children. Rivkin's father died in 1967 and his mother remarried to Chicago obstetrician Dr. John S. Long in 1971.

Rivkin graduated magna cum laude from Harvard College, received a JD from Stanford Law School, where he was an associate editor of the Stanford Law Review, and clerked for Judge Joel M. Flaum of the U.S. Court of Appeals for the 7th Circuit.

Rivkin's father, William R. Rivkin, was United States Ambassador to Luxembourg under President John F. Kennedy and United States Ambassador to Senegal and the Gambia under President Lyndon B. Johnson. His younger brother, Charles, was formerly the United States Ambassador to France and Monaco and currently serves as the chief executive officer of the Motion Picture Association of America. His aunt, Joanne H. Alter was an American activist, politician, and the first woman to break the gender barrier in Chicago area politics. Former Newsweek and current Bloomberg columnist Jonathan Alter is a cousin of Rivkin. Rivkin is the godson of former Democratic Presidential candidate Hubert Humphrey.

In 1988, Rivkin married Cindy S. Moelis in a Jewish ceremony at the East River Yacht Club in Long Island City, Queens; they have two daughters, Stephanie and Claire, and a son, Alexander. His wife, Cindy S. Moelis, served as the director of the White House Fellows Program under President Barack Obama and is now President of the Pritzker Traubert Foundation.
