= 1976 Illinois gubernatorial election =

- November 2, 1976
- Turnout: 74.18% ▼1.1 pp
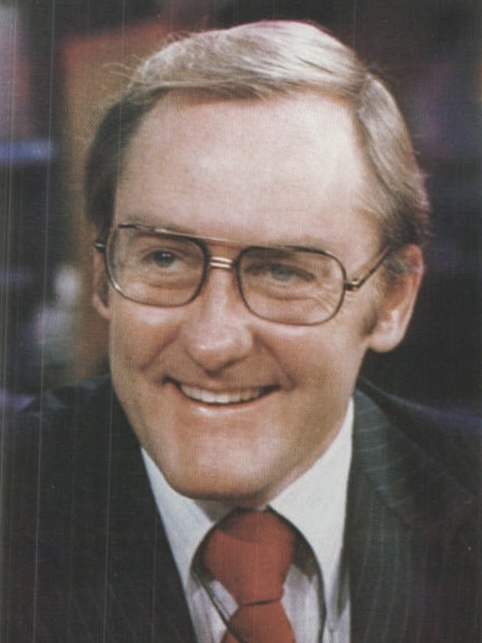

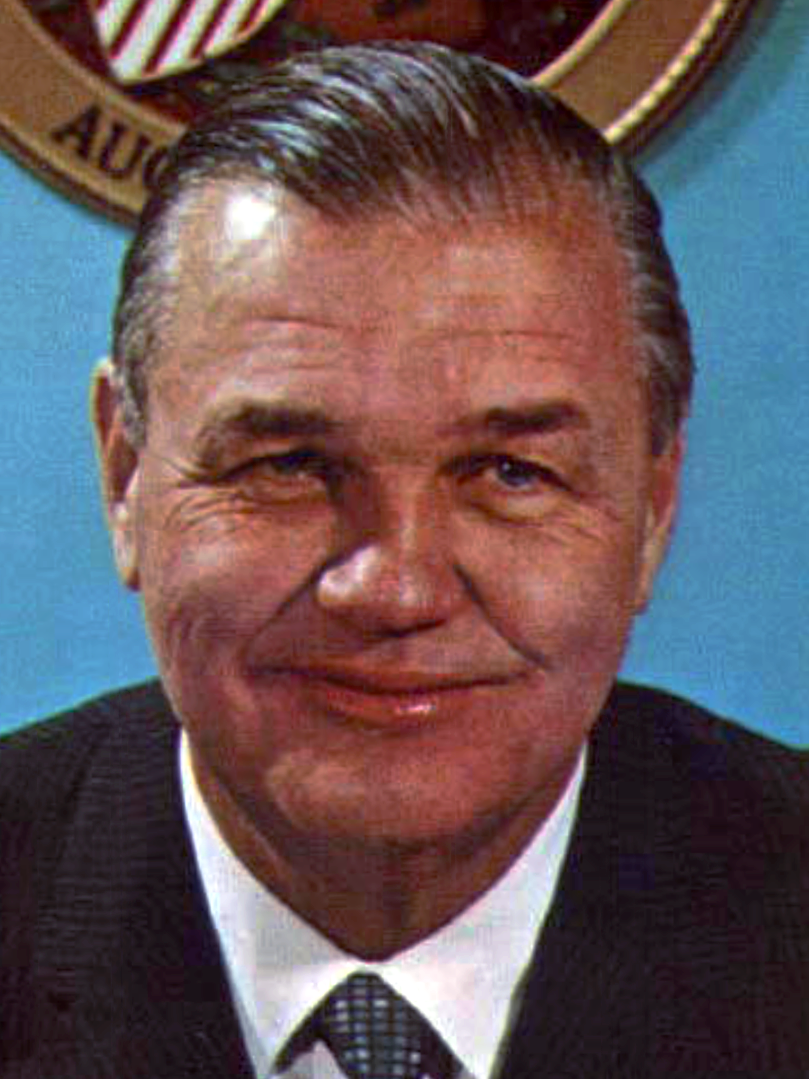
Nominee	Jim Thompson	Michael Howlett
Party	Republican	Democratic
Running mate	Dave O'Neal	Neil Hartigan
Popular vote	3,000,395	1,610,258
Percentage	64.68%	34.71%
- County results Thompson: 50–60% 60–70% 70–80% 80–90% Howlett: 50–60%
Governor before election
Dan Walker
Democratic
Elected Governor
James R. Thompson
Republican

The 1976 Illinois gubernatorial election was held in Illinois on November 2, 1976. Incumbent first-term Democratic governor Dan Walker lost renomination to Illinois Secretary of State Michael Howlett, who was an ally of Chicago mayor Richard J. Daley. Howlett then lost the general election to Republican nominee James R. Thompson. This election was the first of seven consecutive Republican gubernatorial victories in Illinois, a streak not broken until the election of Democrat Rod Blagojevich in 2002. This election is the most recent time an Illinois gubernatorial election was held concurrently with a presidential election. Thompson's margin of victory was the largest in well over a century, after the elections of 1818 and 1848.

== Background ==
This election was for a two-year term which would synchronize future gubernatorial elections with midterm election years, rather than presidential election years, as the 1970 Constitution of Illinois required gubernatorial elections to be held in midterm election years starting in 1978. The previous election had been in 1972.

The primaries (held on March 16) and general election coincided with those for federal offices (United States President and House) and those for other state offices. The election was part of the 1976 Illinois elections.

Turnout in the primaries saw 38.79% in the gubernatorial primaries, with a total of 2,231,910 votes cast, and 33.89% in the lieutenant gubernatorial primary, with 1,949,469 votes cast. Turnout during the general election was 74.18%, with 4,639,010 votes cast.

== Democratic primary ==
=== Governor ===
The incumbent Governor, Dan Walker, had a contentious relationship with the Daley Machine, which backed Secretary of State Michael Howlett. Walker carried most of the state's counties, but Howlett carried Cook county by a wide margin and was ultimately nominated.

County map of the 1976 Illinois Democratic gubernatorial primary Howlett: 50–60% 60–70% Walker: 50–60% 60–70% 70–80% 80–90%.

1976 Democratic gubernatorial primary, Illinois
Party	Candidate	Votes	%
Democratic	Michael J. Howlett	811,721	53.82
Democratic	Dan Walker (incumbent)	696,380	46.17
Write-in		245	0.02
Majority		115,341	7.65
Turnout		1,508,346	

=== Lieutenant governor ===
Incumbent Lieutenant Governor Neil Hartigan was renominated, defeating Metropolitan Water Reclamation District of Greater Chicago commissioner Joanne H. Alter.

Democratic lieutenant gubernatorial primary
Party	Candidate	Votes	%
Democratic	Neil F. Hartigan (incumbent)	857,910	66.29
Democratic	Joanne H. Alter	436,322	33.71
Write-in		29	0.00
Total votes		1,294,232	100

== Republican primary ==
=== Governor ===
Thompson won the Republican Primary in a landslide, carrying every county.

1976 Republican gubernatorial primary, Illinois
Party	Candidate	Votes	%
Republican	James R. Thompson	625,457	86.44
Republican	Richard H. Cooper	97,937	13.54
Write-in		170	0.02
Majority		527,484	29.97
Turnout		723,564	

=== Lieutenant governor ===
Dave O'Neal won the Republican primary, defeating Joan G. Anderson.

Republican lieutenant gubernatorial primary
Party	Candidate	Votes	%
Republican	David C. O'Neal	376,126	57.40
Republican	Joan G. Anderson	279,087	42.59
Write-in		24	0.00
Total votes		655,237	100

== General election ==
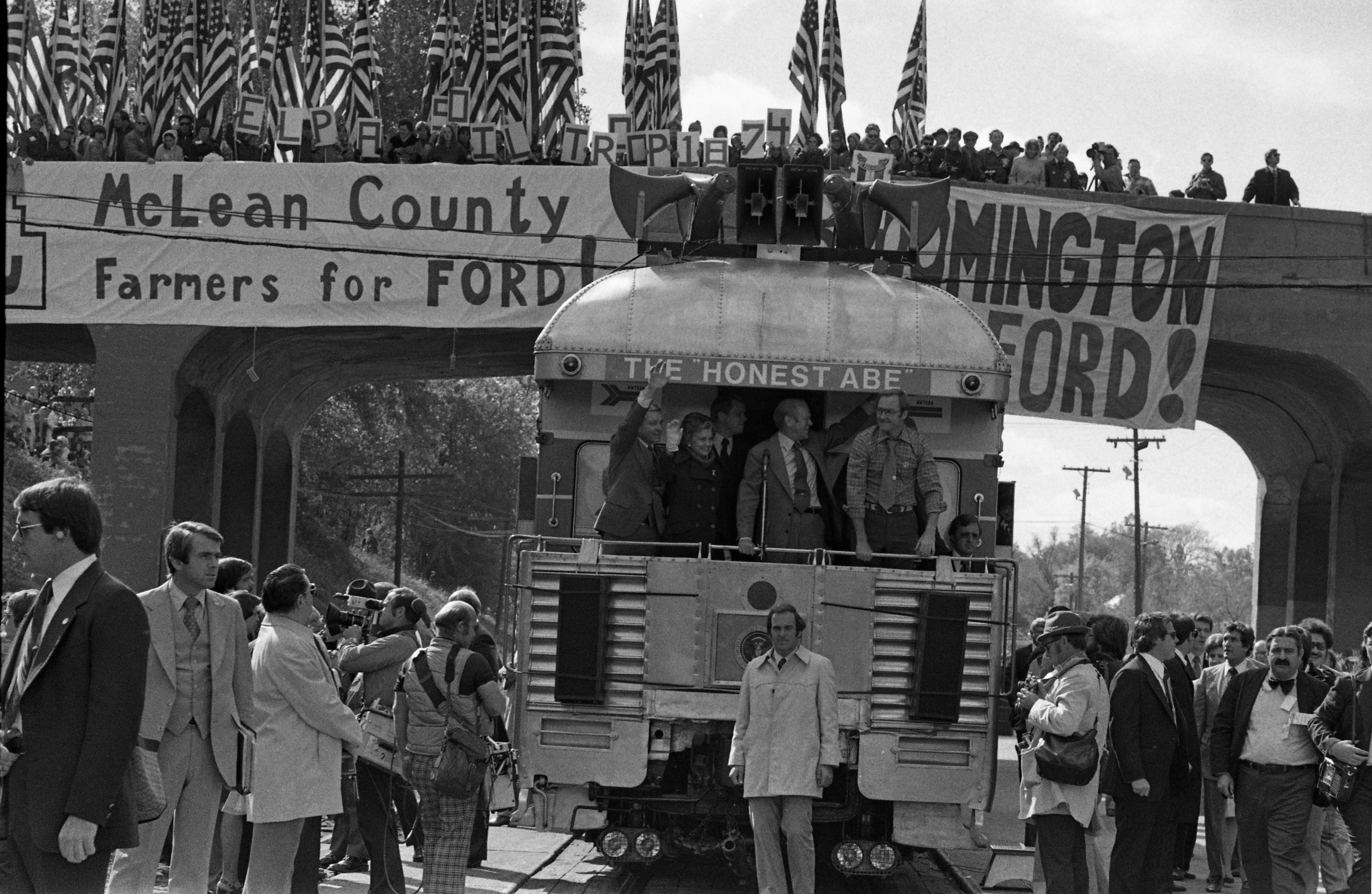
Thompson joins President Gerald Ford, First Lady Betty Ford, and U.S. Senator Charles Percy on a whistle stop in Bloomington.

1976 gubernatorial election, Illinois
Party	Candidate	Votes	%
Republican	James R. Thompson/Dave O'Neal	3,000,365	64.68
Democratic	Michael J. Howlett/Neil F. Hartigan	1,610,258	34.71
Communist	Ishmael Flory/Linda R. Appelhans	10,091	0.22
Libertarian	F. Joseph McCaffrey/Georgia E. Shields	7,552	0.16
Socialist Workers	Suzanne Haig/Dennis Brasky	4,926	0.11
Socialist Labor	George LaForest/Stanley A. Prorok	3,147	0.07
U.S. Labor	Edward Waffle/Peter Matni	2,302	0.05
Write-in		369	0.01
Majority		1,390,137	29.97
Turnout		4,639,010	
Republican gain from Democratic			
