= Michael Lynton =

Businessman (born 1960)

- Born: Michael Mark Lynton; 1 January 1960 (age 66); London, United Kingdom
- Citizenship: American • Dutch
- Education: Harvard University (AB, MBA)
- Occupations: Chairman of Snap Inc. (2017–present); Chairman of WMG (2019–present)
- Spouse: Jamie Alter Lynton (m. 1993)
- Children: 3

Michael Mark Lynton (born 1 January 1960) is an American–Dutch businessman and current chairman of Snap Inc. He previously served as chairman and chief executive of Sony Pictures Entertainment. In 2017, Lynton stepped down as CEO of Sony Entertainment to become Chairman of Snap, makers of the Snapchat mobile app. On 12 February 2019, he was named as chairman of Warner Music Group.

== Early life and education ==
Lynton was born to a Jewish family in London on 1 January 1960. His parents, Marion (Sonnenberg) and Mark Lynton, were executives at Hunter Douglas in the Netherlands. His father, born Max-Otto Ludwig Loewenstein, was born in 1920 in Stuttgart, Germany, and moved to Berlin two years later when his father was named head of a major German car manufacturing company. He later enlisted in the British military, where he served for seven years and worked for the British Intelligence, interrogating German officers. The family later moved to the United States and lived in Scarsdale, New York, for several years before moving to the Netherlands in 1969.

Lynton attended the International School of The Hague and transferred to Phillips Exeter Academy for his senior year, graduating in 1978. He received his BA in history and literature from Harvard College in 1982. After working in finance at Credit Suisse First Boston from 1982 to 1985, he enrolled in Harvard Business School with his sister Lili in 1985 and earned an MBA in 1987.

== Career ==
In 1987, Lynton joined The Walt Disney Company, where he started Disney Publishing. He subsequently served as president of Disney's Hollywood Pictures from 1992 to 1996. From 1996 to 2000, Lynton was chairman and chief executive officer of Pearson plc's Penguin Group, extending the Penguin brand to music and the Internet. In 2000, he joined Time Warner as CEO of AOL Europe, president of AOL International, and president of Time Warner International.

=== Sony ===
In 2004, Lynton became chairman and chief executive officer of Sony Pictures Entertainment (SPE). He led SPE's global operations, including motion pictures, television and digital content production and distribution, as well as home entertainment acquisition and distribution, operation of studio facilities, and the development of new entertainment products, services and technologies.

In April 2012, Sony Corporation announced that Lynton would additionally hold the position of chief executive of Sony Entertainment Inc., overseeing all of Sony's global entertainment businesses, including Sony Music Entertainment, Sony/ATV Music Publishing, and Sony Pictures Entertainment.

Under the leadership of Lynton and Sony Pictures co-chair Amy Pascal, SPE's Motion Pictures Group has been recognized by the Academy of Motion Picture Arts and Sciences, including Best Picture nominations for American Hustle, Captain Phillips, The Social Network, Moneyball and Zero Dark Thirty. Lynton and Pascal have overseen blockbuster movie franchises such as The Amazing Spider-Man, Grown Ups, The Smurfs, and James Bond. Sony Pictures is one of two movie studios to generate more than $1 billion in annual domestic box office sales for more than a decade. In 2012, the studio led the industry in market share and broke box office records with $4.4 billion in revenue worldwide.

Lynton also oversaw Sony Pictures Television (SPT), which produces and distributes television programming for multiple platforms in the U.S. and around the world. SPT's popular and award-winning programs in the U.S. include scripted series such as Breaking Bad, Justified, and The Blacklist, reality series like Shark Tank, The Sing-Off and Re-Modeled, as well as top-ranked game shows and daytime dramas including Wheel of Fortune, Jeopardy!, The Young and the Restless and Days of Our Lives. Launched in collaboration with Oprah Winfrey's Harpo Productions, SPT's The Dr. Oz Show is one of the most popular syndicated programs in America. The show's format has already been exported to 19 countries including Russia, Saudi Arabia, Armenia, Colombia, Chile, Brazil and China. The studio's television channel network reaches approximately 800 million households globally through its 126 channel feeds in more than 150 countries. SPT also operates Crackle.

Lynton headed Sony's global music businesses, including Sony Music Entertainment, the second largest global recorded music company, and Sony/ATV Music Publishing, the largest music publishing company in the world. Sony Music comprises 21 record labels, including Columbia Records, RCA and Epic Records, that collectively feature a roster of approximately 1,500 active artists including Beyoncé, Justin Timberlake, Paul Simon and Michael Jackson.

Lynton and Pascal led the development of two Green Building Council Leadership in Energy and Environmental Design (LEED) certified buildings on the studio's Culver City lot.

=== After Sony ===
In 2018, Lynton and his sister Lili started the publisher Lezen and acquired Arcadia Publishing.

== Activities ==
Lynton is a member of the Council on Foreign Relations and the UK government's Film Policy Review group. He also serves on the board of trustees of the Los Angeles County Museum of Art, the Natural Resources Defense Council, CARE International, and the American Film Institute, as well as the boards of the USC School of Cinematic Arts, the Rand Corporation, IEX Group, and Schrödinger, Inc.

In May 2012, the Harvard Alumni Association elected Lynton to the Harvard Board of Overseers. He joined the board of social media start-up Snapchat in June 2013.

== Personal life ==
In 1993, Lynton married Jamie Alter Lynton, the daughter of Chicago politician Joanne H. Alter. His brother-in-law is the journalist Jonathan Alter. The couple has three daughters. He holds American and Dutch citizenship.
