= Moelis & Company =

Global independent investment bank

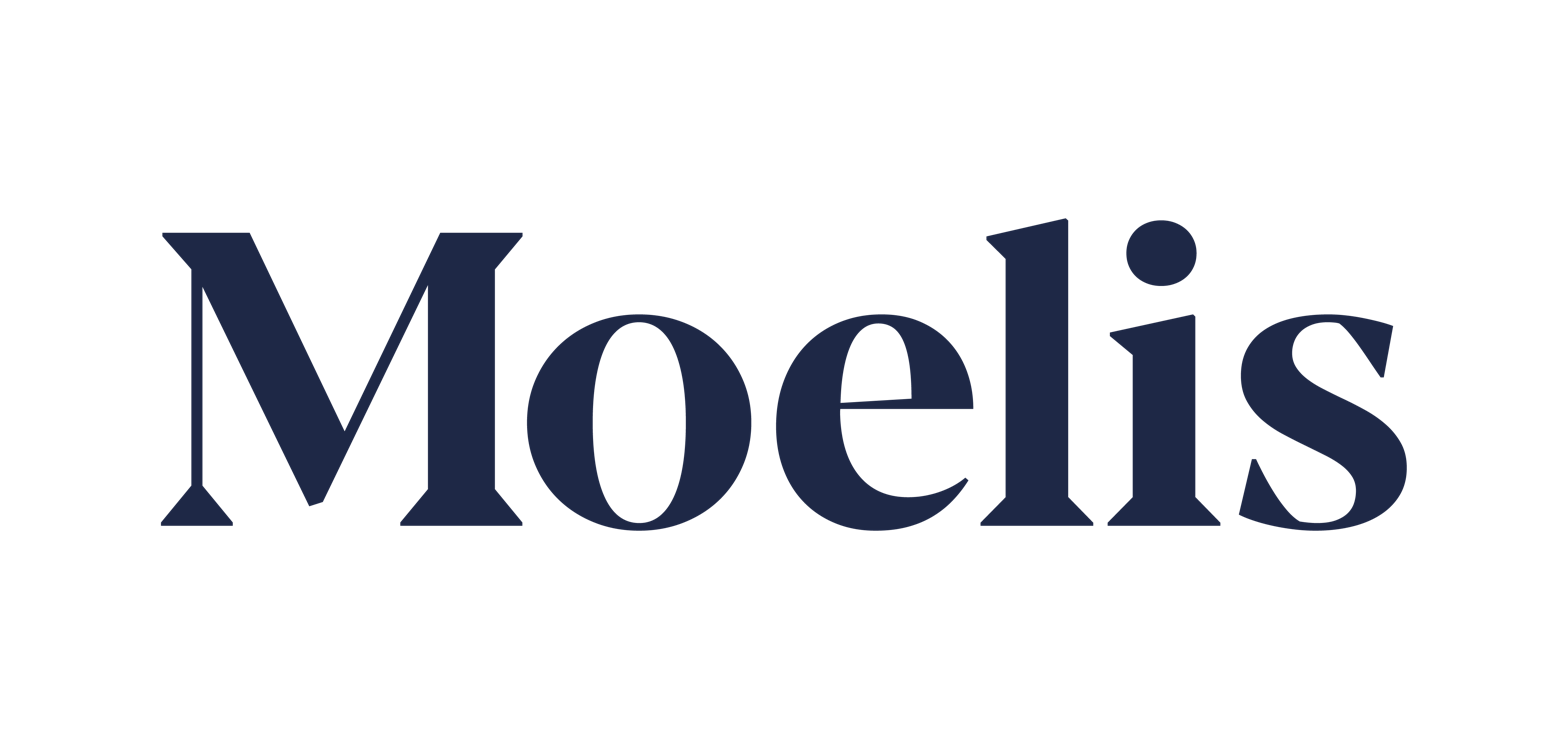

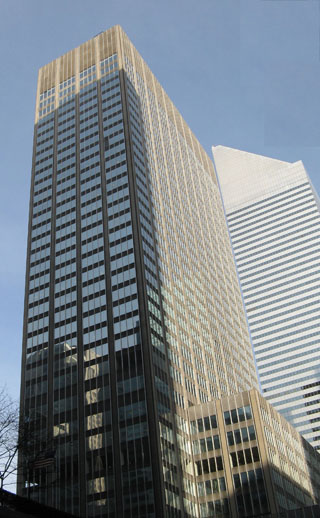
- Headquarters at 399 Park Avenue
- Type: Public
- Traded as: NYSE: MC (Class A); Russell 2000 Component; S&P 600 Component
- Industry: Financial services
- Founded: 2007; 19 years ago
- Founder: Ken Moelis
- Headquarters: 399 Park Avenue, New York City, US
- Key people: Ken Moelis (Founder and Executive Chairman); Navid Mahmoodzadegan (CEO and Co-Founder); Jeff Raich (Executive Vice Chairman and Co-Founder); Eric Cantor (Vice Chairman)
- Products: Investment banking
- Revenue: $1.558 billion (2021)
- Number of employees: 1400
- Website: www.moelis.com

Moelis & Company is a global investment bank that provides financial advisory services to corporations, governments, and financial sponsors. The firm advises on strategic decisions such as mergers and acquisitions, recapitalizations and restructurings and other corporate finance matters. Moelis has advised on more than $4 trillion in transactions since its inception.

The firm was founded in 2007 and is headquartered in New York City. It has over 1400 employees across 24 locations in North and South America, Europe, the Middle East, Asia and Australia.

== History ==
=== Founding and early years ===
Moelis was founded in July 2007 by Ken Moelis and partners including Navid Mahmoodzadegan and Jeffrey Raich. The firm opened in New York and Los Angeles, and expanded to six cities within two years.

Moelis became a top 10 ranked M&A advisor in the US in its first full year of operations, advising on transactions such as Anheuser-Busch's $61.2 billion sale to InBev, Yahoo's defense from Microsoft's $44.6 billion unsolicited proposal, and Hilton Hotels' $26.5 billion sale to The Blackstone Group.

In 2008, Moelis opened its restructuring practice with senior bankers in New York, Los Angeles, and London. Early restructuring mandates included the $29.6 billion reorganization of AMR Corp and its $17.0 billion merger with US Airways Group, the £1.5 billion recapitalization of the Co-operative Bank, and the €15.4 billion restructuring of Glitnir.

In August 2009, Moelis opened an office in Sydney, Australia which has since advised SABMiller on the $10.15 billion acquisition of Fosters Group, and Blackstone on the A$8.9bn acquisition of Crown Resorts Limited. It also advised a consortium including Deutsche Bank, KKR and Värde Partners on the A$8.2 billion acquisition of GE Capital Australia & New Zealand Consumer Finance, and advised Centro Properties on the A$4.3 billion restructuring and A$5.0 billion merger of Australian interests. Moelis Australia went public on the Australian Securities Exchange in 2017 and now operates as MA Financial Group under the stock ticker MAF.

The firm opened a Dubai office in January 2011 while advising the Government of Dubai on the $24.9 billion restructuring of its investment holding company, Dubai World. The firm also expanded into Asia by opening a Hong Kong office.

In January 2012, Moelis announced a strategic alliance agreement with the second largest Japanese bank, SMFG, and its subsidiary SMBC Nikko Securities. Together they have advised on significant cross-border M&A including Osaka Securities Exchange's ¥278.4 billion combination with the Tokyo Stock Exchange.

In March 2014, the firm expanded into South America, opening an office in São Paulo, Brazil.

In April 2014, the firm completed its initial public offering and began trading on the New York Stock Exchange. Moelis had advised on over $1 trillion in transactions by the time of its IPO.

=== Post-IPO ===
In June 2014, Moelis established a private funds advisory business (now renamed Private Capital Advisory) with four hires focusing on capital raising and advisory services.

In February 2015, the firm opened its Washington DC office, following the hire of Eric Cantor, Vice Chairman and former House Majority Leader. Co-founders Mahmoodzadegan and Raich were promoted to co-presidents in September of that year.

In February 2017, the company was appointed as a lead adviser for the planned initial public offering of Saudi Aramco, the “biggest equity advisory mandate in history.” The IPO was relisted in 2024 with Moelis & Company as advisor. In the Middle East, the company also worked with Dubai World, and Abraaj among others.

In April 2023, Moelis expanded its technology franchise and hired a team from Silicon Valley Bank, including a new Global Head of Technology Investment Banking. This doubled the number of bankers on its technology team.

Also in 2023, the company expanded their office in Brazil to 20 people in response to a pattern of debt-restructuring in the region, and worked with companies such as Oi SA.

On June 9, 2024, one of the firm's managing directors who led the business services sector, Jonathan Kaye, was filmed in Brooklyn punching a person in the face. The firm released a statement confirming the man in the video was one of their employees and that the company is conducting an investigation into the incident. Kaye was put on leave and subsequently resigned from the firm.

Notable transactions from this period also include the acquisition of Chelsea F.C., CK Hutchison’s merger with Three UK Group and Vodafone UK Group, and the sale of a minority stake in the New York Giants.

In June 2025, Ken Moelis announced that he would become the Executive Chairman of Moelis & Company, with Navid Mahmoodzadegan taking the role of CEO, effective October 1, 2025. Jeff Raich would become Executive Vice Chairman.

== Global reach ==
Moelis operates from 24 offices globally across North and South America, Europe, the Middle East, Asia, and Australia:

- (Netherlands) Amsterdam
- (China) Beijing
- (United States) Boston
- (United States) Chicago
- (United States) Dallas
- (United Arab Emirates) Dubai
- (Germany) Frankfurt
- Hong Kong
- (United States) Houston
- (United Kingdom) London
- (United States) Los Angeles
- (Australia) Melbourne*
- Mexico City**
- (Mexico) Monterrey**
- (India) Mumbai
- (United States) New York City
- (France) Paris
- (Saudi Arabia) Riyadh
- (United States) San Francisco
- (Brazil) São Paulo
- (Australia) Sydney*
- (Israel) Tel Aviv
- (United States) Washington, D.C.
- (United States) West Palm Beach

*Strategic Alliance with MA Financial Group **Strategic Alliance with Alfaro, Dávila & Scherer

== See also ==
- List of investment banks
- Boutique investment bank
