= Pete Hamill =

American journalist (1935–2020)

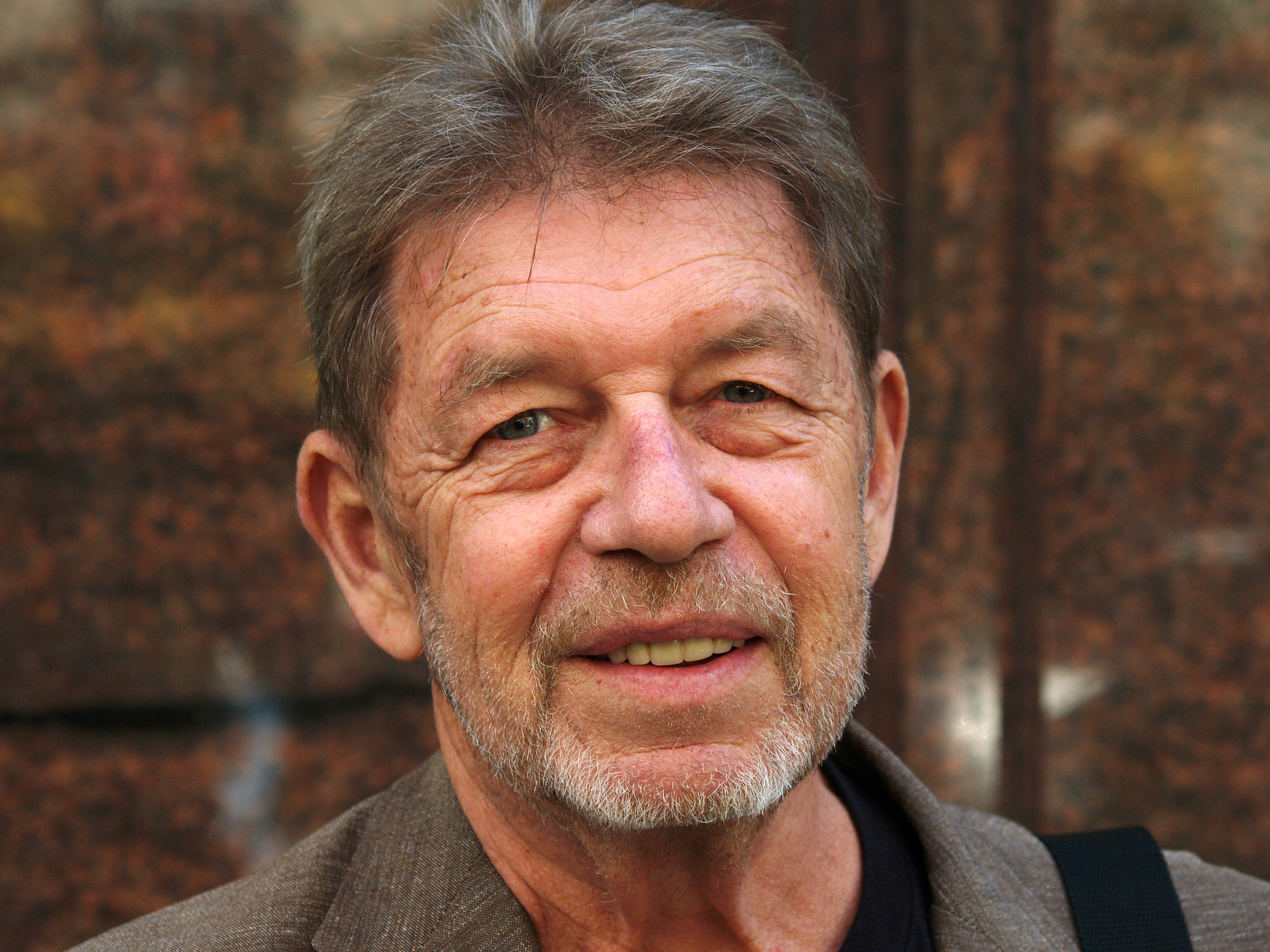
- Hamill in 2007
- Born: William Peter Hamill; June 24, 1935; Brooklyn, New York City, U.S.
- Died: August 5, 2020 (aged 85); Brooklyn, New York City, U.S.
- Occupation: Writer
- Spouses: Ramona Negron (m. 1962; div. 1970) Fukiko Aoki (m. 1987)
- Website: petehamill.com

William Peter Hamill (June 24, 1935 – August 5, 2020) was an American journalist, novelist, essayist and editor. During his career as a New York City journalist, he was described as "the author of columns that sought to capture the particular flavors of New York City's politics and sports and the particular pathos of its crime." Hamill was a columnist and editor for the New York Post and the New York Daily News.

== Early life and education ==
The eldest of seven children of Catholic immigrants from Belfast, Northern Ireland, Hamill was born in the Park Slope section of Brooklyn. His father, Billy Hamill, lost a leg as the result of an injury during a semi-professional soccer game in Brooklyn. Hamill's mother, Anne Devlin Hamill, a high school graduate, arrived in New York on the day the stock market crashed in 1929. Billy Hamill was introduced to Anne Devlin in 1933 and they married the following year. Billy Hamill had jobs as a grocery clerk, in a war plant, and later in a factory producing lighting fixtures. Anne Hamill was employed in Wanamaker's department store, and she also worked as a domestic, a nurses' aide, and a cashier in the RKO movie chain. Hamill's younger brother, Denis, also became a columnist for the Daily News.

Hamill attended Holy Name of Jesus grammar school and delivered the Brooklyn Daily Eagle when he was 11. In 1949, Hamill attended the prestigious Regis High School in Manhattan, but he left school when he was 15 to work as an apprentice sheet metal worker in the Brooklyn Navy Yard; 59 years later, in June 2010, Regis awarded him an honorary diploma. Inspired especially by the work of Milton Caniff, he was set on becoming a comic book artist. Hamill attended night classes at the School of Visual Arts (then called the Cartoonists and Illustrators School), with the goal of becoming a painter. He also took courses at Pratt Institute, which awarded him an honorary doctorate in 1980. In the fall of 1952, he enlisted in the U.S. Navy. Following his discharge, in 1956–57, he was a student at Mexico City College on the G.I. Bill.

== Career ==
=== Journalism ===
In 1958, while serving as the art director for a Greek-language newspaper the Atlantis, Hamill talked his way into writing his first piece about his friend, Puerto Rican professional boxer José Torres, then a neophyte middleweight and Olympic champion. This led Hamill to pursue writing a few letters to the editor for the New York Post of which two were printed. Hamill eventually attracted enough attention and was hired as a reporter for the New York Post in 1960. The 1962–63 New York City newspaper strike led Hamill to start writing magazine articles. By the fall of 1963 he was a correspondent for The Saturday Evening Post, stationed in Europe. Hamill spent six months in Barcelona and five months in Dublin, and traveled Europe interviewing actors, movie directors, and authors, as well as ordinary citizens. In August 1964 he returned to New York, reported on the Democratic Convention in Atlantic City, and was briefly employed as a feature writer at the New York Herald Tribune. He began writing a column for the New York Post in late 1965, and, by the end of that year, was reporting from Vietnam.

For more than four decades, he worked at the New York Post, the New York Daily News, the Village Voice, and New York Newsday. He served briefly as editor of the Post, and later as editor-in-chief of the Daily News. His resignation from the latter position after eight months prompted a letter of protest signed by more than a hundred of the paper's writers. Hamill's more extensive journalistic pieces have been published in New York, The New Yorker, Esquire, Playboy, Rolling Stone, and other periodicals. He wrote about wars in Vietnam, Nicaragua, Lebanon and Northern Ireland, and reported on America's urban riots of the 1960s.

Hamill wrote about the New York underclass and racial division, most notably in an essay for Esquire magazine, "Breaking the Silence". He also wrote about boxing, baseball, art, and contemporary music, winning a Grammy Award in 1975 for the liner notes to Bob Dylan's Blood on the Tracks. However, while at the New York Post, Hamill wrote of the later exonerated Central Park Five that the teens hailed “from a world of crack, welfare, guns, knives, indifference and ignorance…a land with no fathers…to smash, hurt, rob, stomp, rape. The enemies were rich. The enemies were white.”

Two collections of his selected journalism have been published: Irrational Ravings and Piecework (1996). For the Library of America he edited two volumes of the journalism of A. J. Liebling. In 1998, he published an extended essay on contemporary journalism titled News is a Verb: Journalism at the End of the Twentieth Century.

=== Fiction ===
External media

Audio
- Interview with Hamill on Tokyo Sketches, 1993, Wired for Books
- Fresh Air interview with Hamill on Tabloid City, May 4, 2011, National Public Radio

Video
- Booknotes interview with Hamill on A Drinking Life, May 29, 1994, C-SPAN
- Presentation by Hamill on Forever: A Novel, January 22, 2003, C-SPAN
- Interview with Hamill on Downtown: My Manhattan, February 12, 2005, C-SPAN

Hamill also wrote fiction, producing ten novels and two collections of short stories. His first novel, a thriller called A Killing for Christ, about a plot to assassinate the Pope on Easter Sunday in Rome, was published in 1968. Drawing on his youth in Brooklyn he next wrote a semi-autobiographical novel called The Gift. Most of his fiction is set in New York City, including Snow in August (1997), Forever (2003), North River (2007), and Tabloid City (2011).

His 1971 column Going Home, about a released prisoner on his way home by bus, inspired the smash 1973 hit song Tie A Yellow Ribbon Round The Ole Oak Tree.

Hamill published more than 100 short stories in newspapers, including those that were part of a series called The Eight Million in the New York Post; in the Daily News, his stories ran under the title Tales of New York. He published two volumes of short stories: The Invisible City: A New York Sketchbook (1980) and Tokyo Sketches (1992).

=== Nonfiction ===
Hamill's 1994 memoir, A Drinking Life, chronicled his journey from childhood into his thirties, his embrace of drinking and the decision to abandon it. According to Hamill, Frank McCourt was inspired by the book to complete his own memoir, Angela's Ashes. Hamill's memoir Downtown: My Manhattan includes his reporting for the New York Daily News on the destruction of the World Trade Center on September 11, 2001, at which he was present.

Hamill's book on the Mexican muralist Diego Rivera was inspired by time spent in Mexico City in 1957 and his presence at Rivera's funeral. In Tools as Art (1995), Hamill surveys the Hechinger Collection and the incorporation of utilitarian objects for aesthetic ends. His biographical essay on the artist was featured in Underground Together: The Art and Life of Harvey Dinnerstein (2008), whose work, like Hamill's, often focuses on the people and cultural life of Brooklyn.

Hamill's interest in photography informed his later essays in nonfiction. New York: City of Islands (2007), celebrates the photography of Jake Rajs. New York Exposed: Photographs from the Daily News (2001) contains an extended essay about the New York Daily News and its role in American photojournalism. In his introduction to Mexico: The Revolution and Beyond (2003), Hamill writes about Agustin Victor Casasola, whose photographs recorded the Revolution of 1910–1920. In his introduction to A Living Lens: Photographs of Jewish Life from the Pages of the Forward (2007), Hamill evokes the heyday of American Yiddish journalism. His text for The Times Square Gym (1996) enhances John Goodman's photographs of prizefighters, while his introduction to Garden of Dreams: Madison Square Garden (2004) offers a context for the sports photography of George Kalinski. Hamill's Irish heritage informs the text for The Irish Face in America (2004), as seen by the photographer Jim Smith.

Hamill also wrote about comic strips, of which he was a collector. Among his writings on the subject are an introduction to Terry and the Pirates: Volume Two by Milton Caniff (2007), and an introductory text for a revised version of Al Hirschfeld's The Speakeasies of 1932 (2003). He also contributed an introduction to Jerry Robinson: Ambassador of Comics (2010).

=== Television and film ===
Hamill penned a handful of teleplays and screenplays, including adaptations of his own novels, and had a few minor film roles, usually playing a generic "reporter," or himself. According to Robert Rosen, the Producer on French Connection II, he re-wrote all of the dialogue in the film, working nearly non-stop for three days, for which he did not receive screen credit. He appeared as a commentator in several documentaries, including Ric Burns' New York: A Documentary Film, and Ken Burns' Prohibition. He also appeared as a speaker in the 2018, 4-part Netflix documentary titled Bobby Kennedy for President. Hamill played himself in the 1990 film King of New York, directed by Abel Ferrara and starring Christopher Walken.

== Personal life ==
Hamill married his first wife, Ramona Negron, in 1962. Together, they had two daughters, Adrienne and Deirdre. They divorced in 1970. Seventeen years later, he married Fukiko Aoki, a fellow journalist from Japan. His work meant that he resided for long periods of time in Spain, Ireland, Saigon, San Juan, Puerto Rico, Rome, Los Angeles, and Santa Fe, New Mexico.

A friend of Robert F. Kennedy, Hamill helped persuade the senator to run for the United States presidency. He subsequently worked for Kennedy's campaign and covered it as a journalist. He was one of four men who disarmed Sirhan Sirhan of his gun in the immediate aftermath of the senator's assassination.

Hamill died on August 5, 2020, at NewYork–Presbyterian Brooklyn Methodist Hospital. He was 85, and suffered from heart and kidney failure at the time of his death, in addition to having fractured his right hip in a fall.

== Honors ==
Hamill received the Ernie Pyle Lifetime Achievement Award from the National Society of Newspaper Columnists in 2005. In 2010 Hamill received an Honorary Doctor of Letters Degree from St. John's University. In 2010 he was presented the Louis Auchincloss Prize from the Museum of the City of New York. In 2014 Hamill received the George Polk Career Award.

Hamill was a Distinguished Writer in Residence at the Arthur L. Carter Journalism Institute at New York University.

Hamill and Jimmy Breslin were interviewed for the 2019 HBO documentary Breslin and Hamill: Deadline Artists, which details both the friendship and competition between New York City's two most read columnists of their era.

A stretch of Seventh Avenue between 11th Street and 12th Street in Park Slope, Brooklyn, is named "Pete Hamill Way."

== Bibliography ==
=== Fiction ===
- A Killing for Christ (1968) ISBN 978-1617755781
- The Gift (1973) ISBN 978-0316011891
- Dirty Laundry (1978) ISBN 978-0553114157
- Flesh and Blood (1977) ISBN 978-0553118971
- The Deadly Piece (1979) ISBN 978-0553120738
- The Guns of Heaven (1984) ISBN 978-0843955958
- Loving Women (1989) ISBN 978-0394575285
- Tokyo Sketches : Short Stories (1992) ISBN 978-4770016973
- Snow in August (1998) ISBN 978-0316242820
- Forever (2003) ISBN 978-0316735698
- North River (2007) ISBN 978-0316007993
- Tabloid City (2011) ISBN 978-0316020763
- The Christmas Kid And Other Brooklyn Stories (2012) ISBN 978-0316232739

=== Non-fiction ===
- Irrational Ravings (1971) LCCN 77163410
- The Invisible City : Short Stories (1980) ISBN 978-0394503776 - though subtitled "Short Stories" it is a collection of magazine journalism
- A Drinking Life : A Memoir (1995) ISBN 978-0316341028
- Piecework (1996) ISBN 978-0316340984
- News is a Verb (1998) ISBN 978-0739402795
- Why Sinatra Matters (1999) ISBN 978-0316347174
- Diego Rivera (1999) ISBN 978-3836568975
- Downtown : My Manhattan (2004) ISBN 978-0316734516
- News is a Verb: Journalism at the End of the Twentieth Century (2011)
- They Are Us: A Plea for Common Sense about Immigration (2011)
